= Ancient Greek architecture =

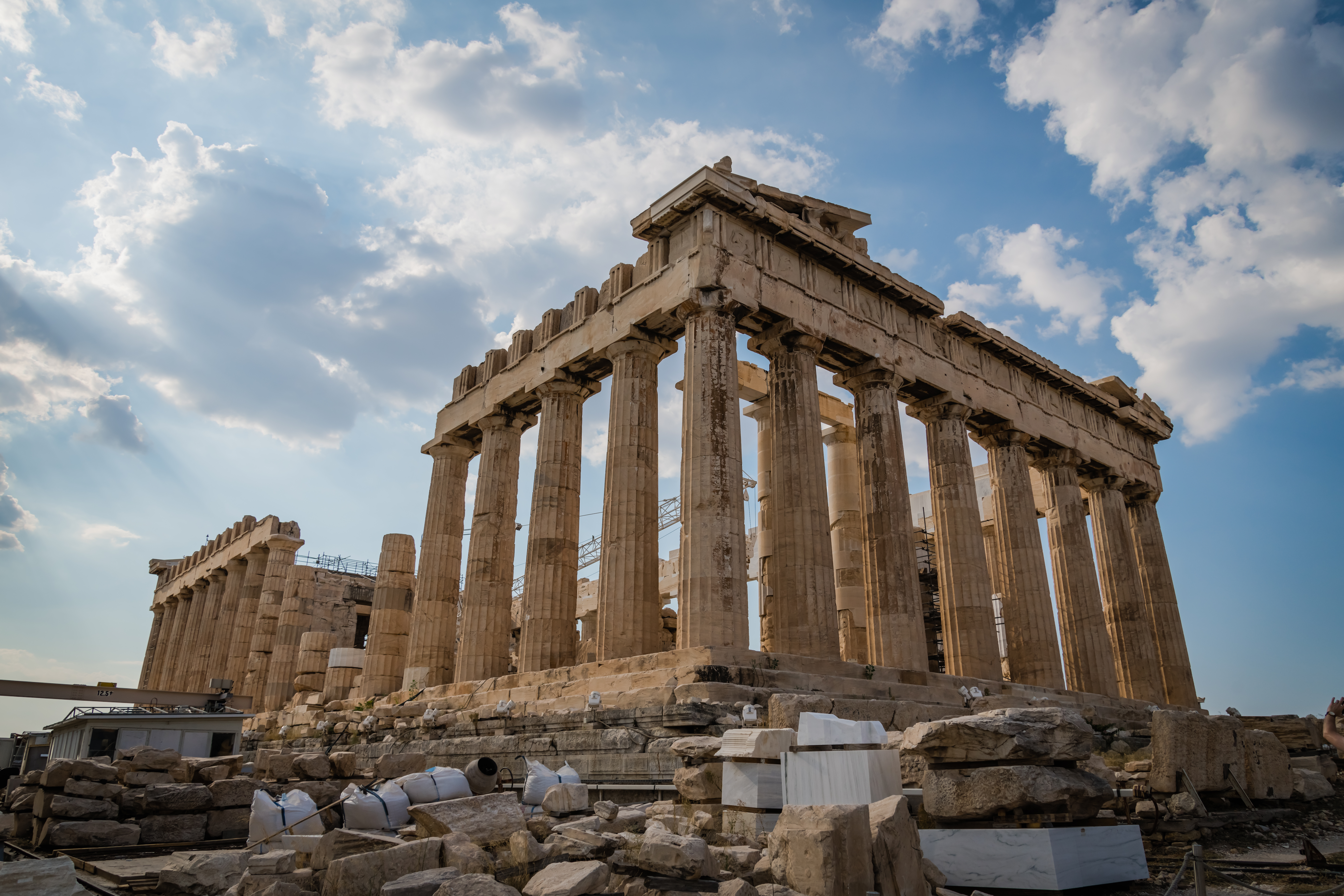
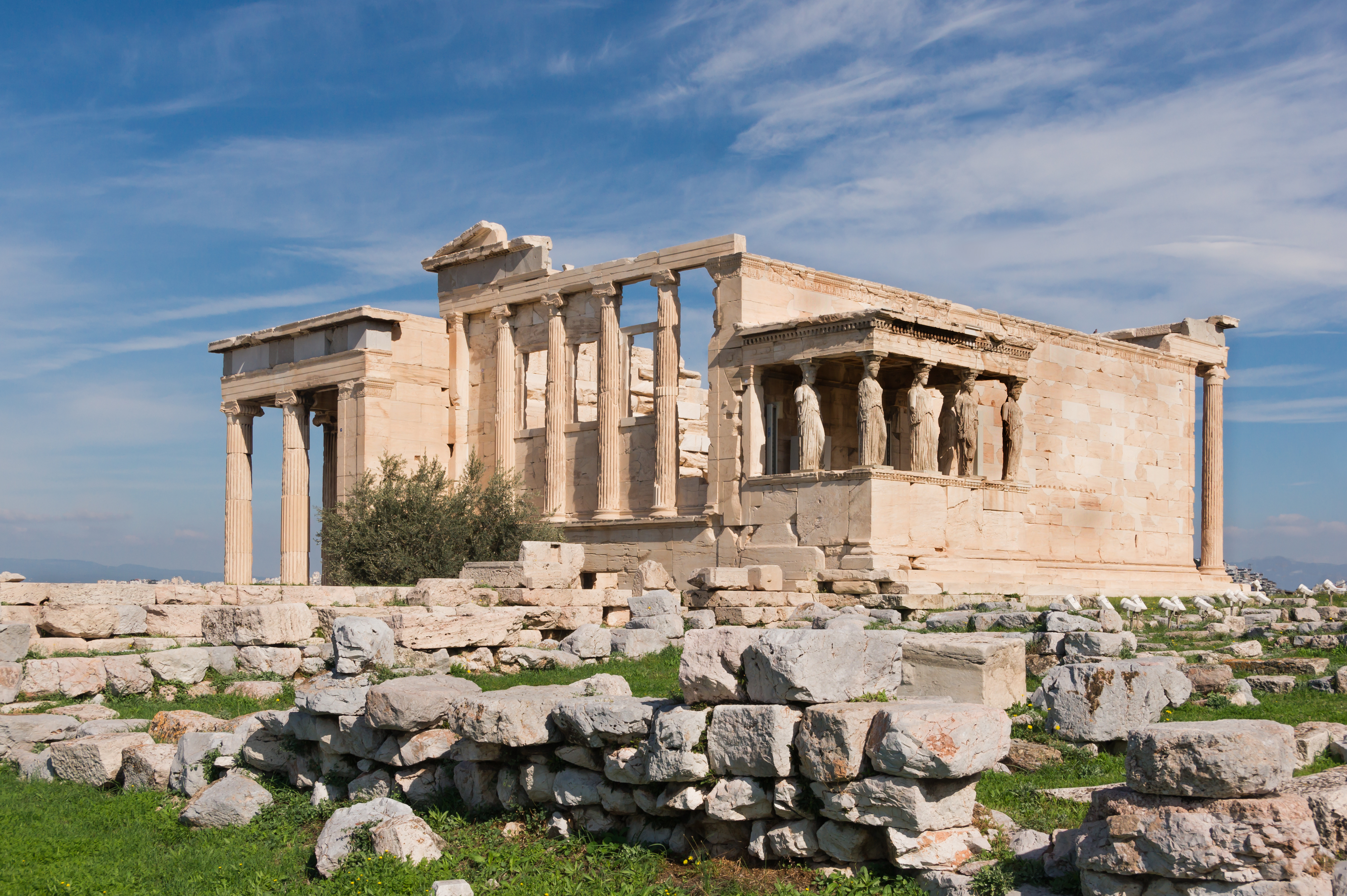
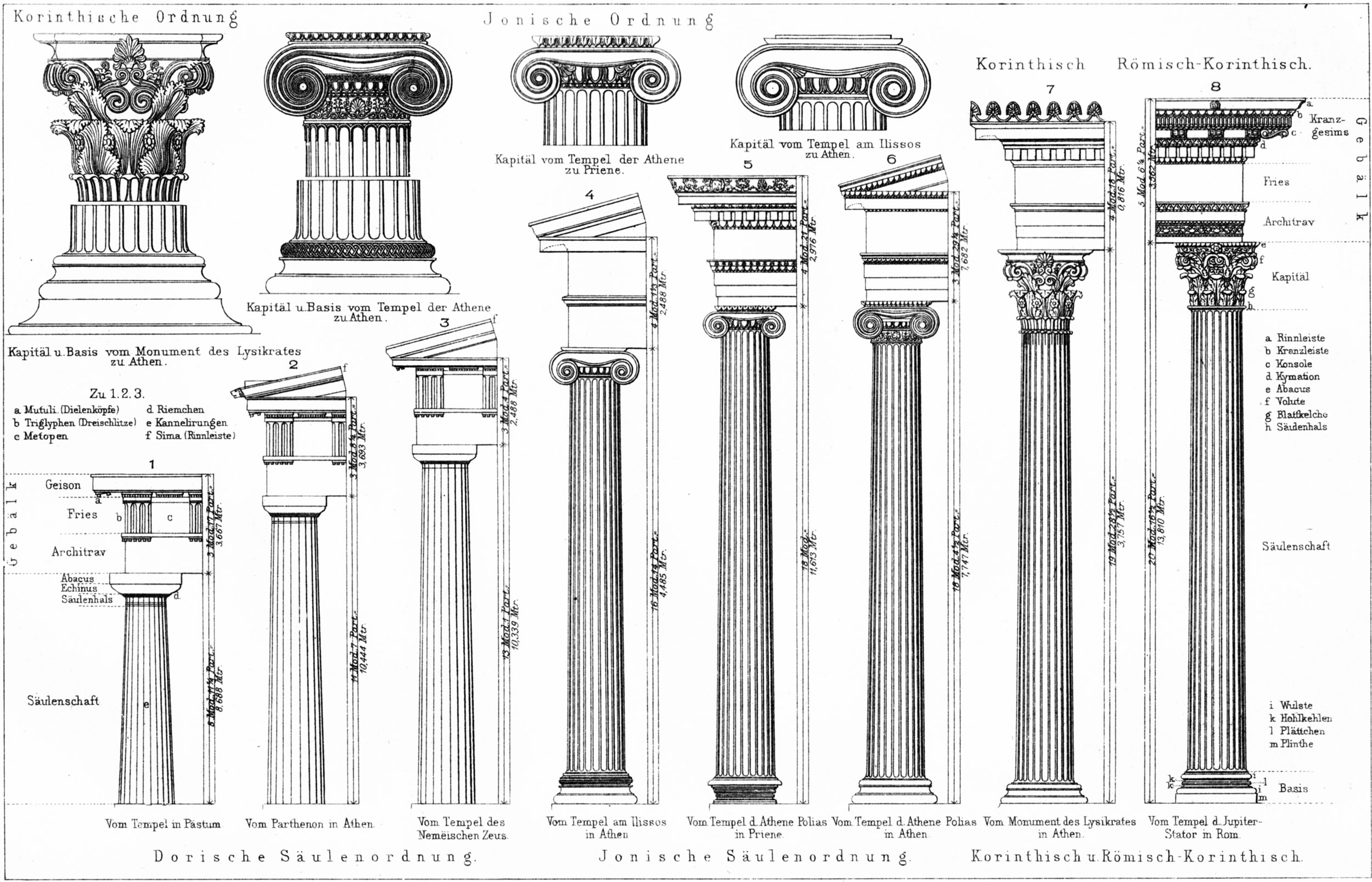
- Top: The Parthenon (460–406 BC); Centre: The Erechtheion (421–406 BC); Bottom: Illustration of Doric (left three), Ionic (middle three) and Corinthian (right two) columns

Additional media
- Years active: c. 900 BC – 1st century AD
- Location: The Greek mainland, the Peloponnese, the Aegean Islands, Anatolia, and in colonies
- Influences: Ancient Egyptian; Ancient Mesopotamian
- Influenced: Ancient Roman; Greek Revival; Neoclassical

Ancient Greek architecture was made by the Greeks, or Hellenes, whose culture flourished on mainland Greece, the Peloponnese, Aegean Islands, and in colonies in Anatolia and Italy for a period from about 900 BC until the 1st century AD, with the earliest surviving architectural works dating from around 600 BC.

Ancient Greek architecture is best known for its temples, many of which are found throughout the region, with the Parthenon regarded, now as in ancient times, as the prime example. Most remains are very incomplete ruins, but a number survive substantially intact, many outside modern Greece. The second important type of building that survives all over the Hellenic world is the open-air theatre, with the earliest dating from around 525–480 BC. Other architectural forms that sometimes survive are the processional gateway (propylon), the public square (agora) surrounded by storied colonnade (stoa), the town council building (bouleuterion), the public monument, the monumental tomb (mausoleum) and the stadium.

Ancient Greek architecture is distinguished by its highly formalised characteristics, both of structure and decoration. This is particularly so in the case of temples where each building appears to have been conceived as a sculptural entity within the landscape, very often raised on high ground so that the elegance of its proportions and the effects of light on its surfaces might be viewed from all angles. Nikolaus Pevsner refers to "the plastic shape of the [Greek] temple [...] placed before us with a physical presence more intense, more alive than that of any later building".

The formal vocabulary of ancient Greek architecture, in particular the division of architectural style into three defined orders: the Doric Order, the Ionic Order and the Corinthian Order, was to have a profound effect on Western architecture of later periods. The architecture of ancient Rome grew out of that of Greece and maintained its influence in Italy unbroken until the present day. The Achaemenid and Nabataean architectural traditions also demonstrate influences of ancient Greek architecture. From the Renaissance, revivals of Classicism have kept alive not only the precise forms and ordered details of Greek architecture, but also its concept of architectural beauty based on balance and proportion. The successive styles of Neoclassical architecture and Greek Revival architecture followed and adapted ancient Greek styles closely.

== Influences ==
=== Geography ===
The mainland and islands of Greece are very rocky, with deeply indented coastline, and rugged mountain ranges with few substantial forests. The most freely available building material is stone. Limestone was readily available and easily worked. There is an abundance of high quality white marble both on the mainland and islands, particularly Paros and Naxos. This finely grained material was a major contributing factor to precision of detail, both architectural and sculptural, that adorned ancient Greek architecture. Deposits of high-quality potter's clay were found throughout Greece and the Islands, with major deposits near Athens. It was used not only for pottery vessels but also roof tiles and architectural decoration.

The climate of Greece is maritime, with both the coldness of winter and the heat of summer tempered by sea breezes. This led to a lifestyle where many activities took place outdoors. Hence temples were placed on hilltops, their exteriors designed as a visual focus of gatherings and processions, while theatres were often an enhancement of a naturally occurring sloping site where people could sit, rather than a containing structure. Colonnades encircling buildings, or surrounding courtyards provided shelter from the sun and from sudden winter storms.

The light of Greece may be another important factor in the development of the particular character of ancient Greek architecture. The light is often extremely bright, with both the sky and the sea vividly blue. The clear light and sharp shadows give a precision to the details of the landscape, pale rocky outcrops and seashore. This clarity is alternated with periods of haze that varies in colour to the light on it. In this characteristic environment, the ancient Greek architects constructed buildings that were marked by the precision of detail. The gleaming marble surfaces were smooth, curved, fluted, or ornately sculpted to reflect the sun, cast graded shadows and change in colour with the ever-changing light of day.

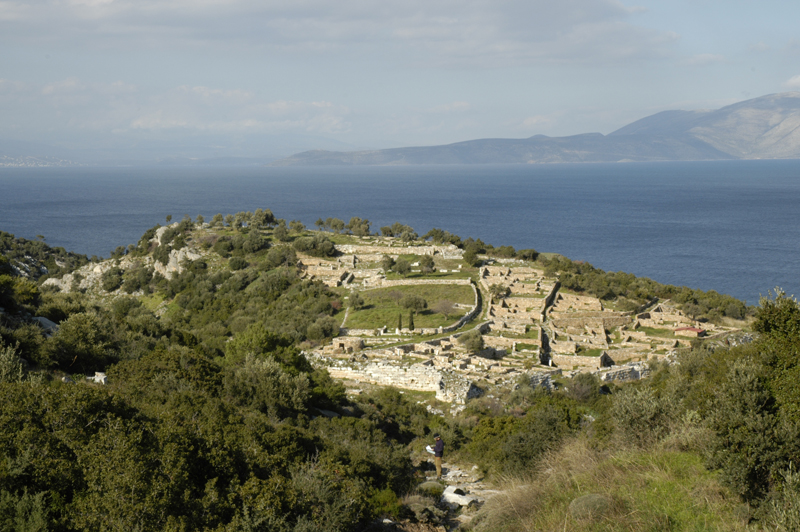
The rugged indented coastline at Rhamnous, Attica

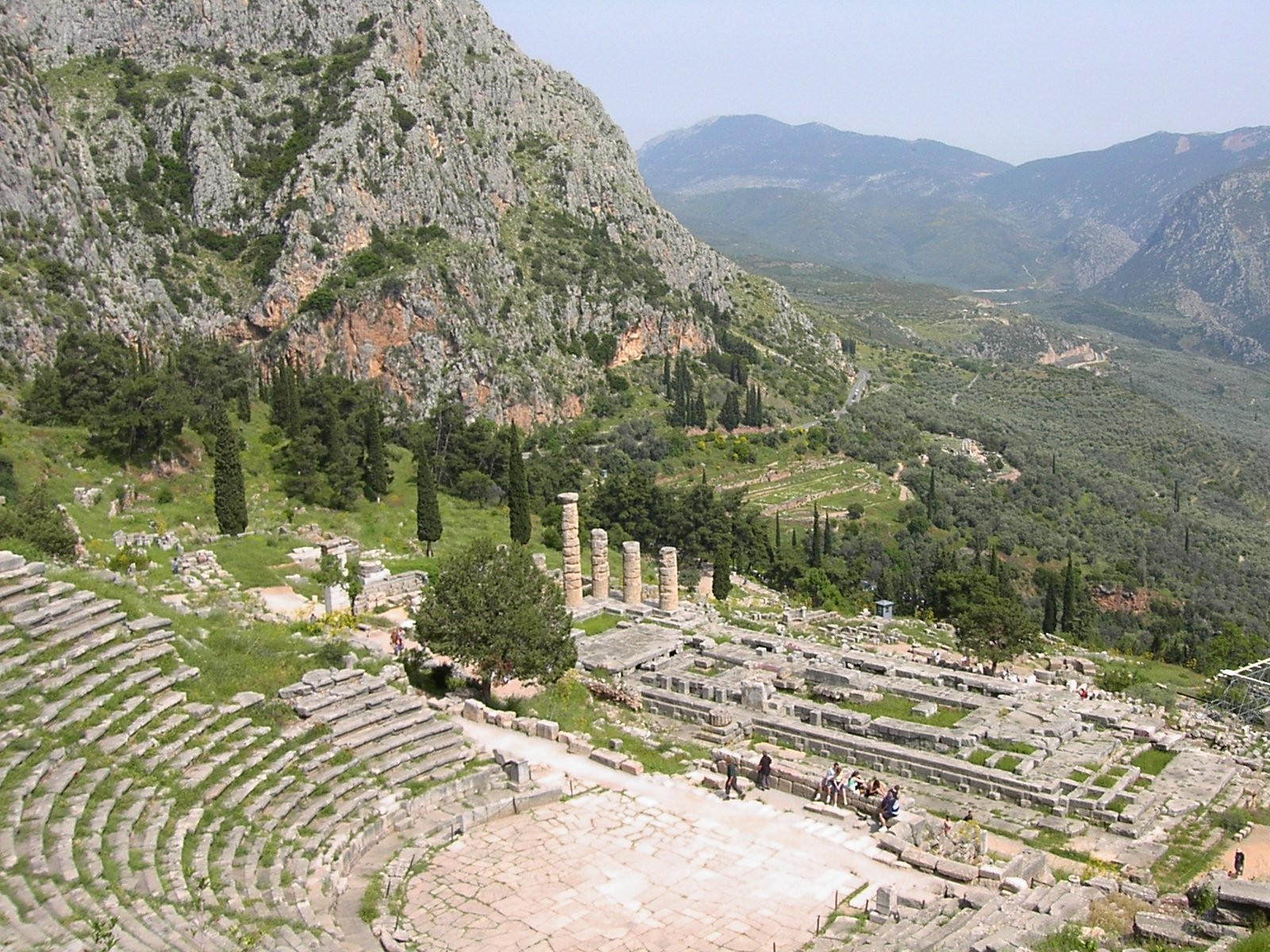
The Theatre and Temple of Apollo in mountainous country at Delphi

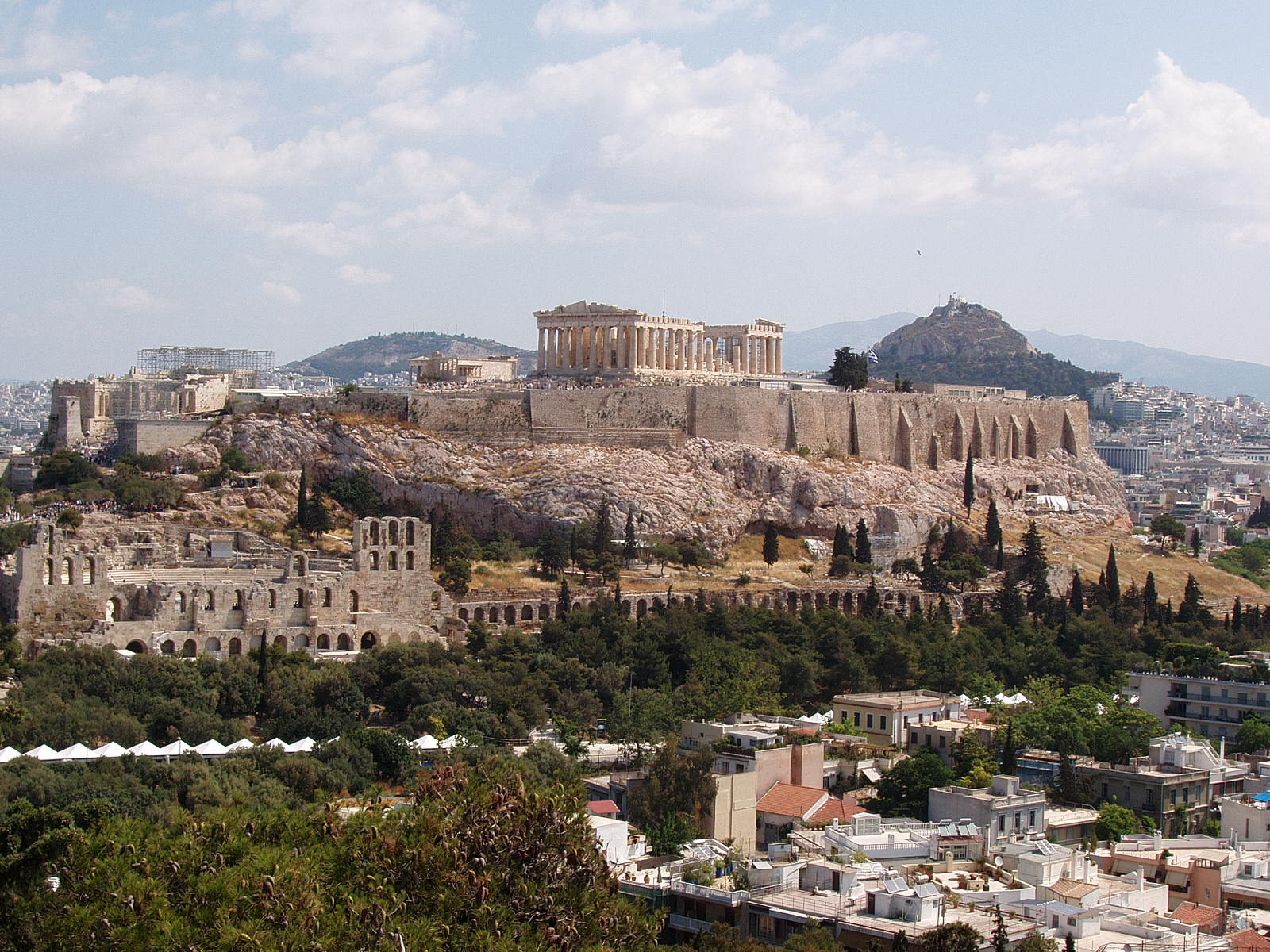
The Acropolis, Athens, is high above the city on a natural prominence.

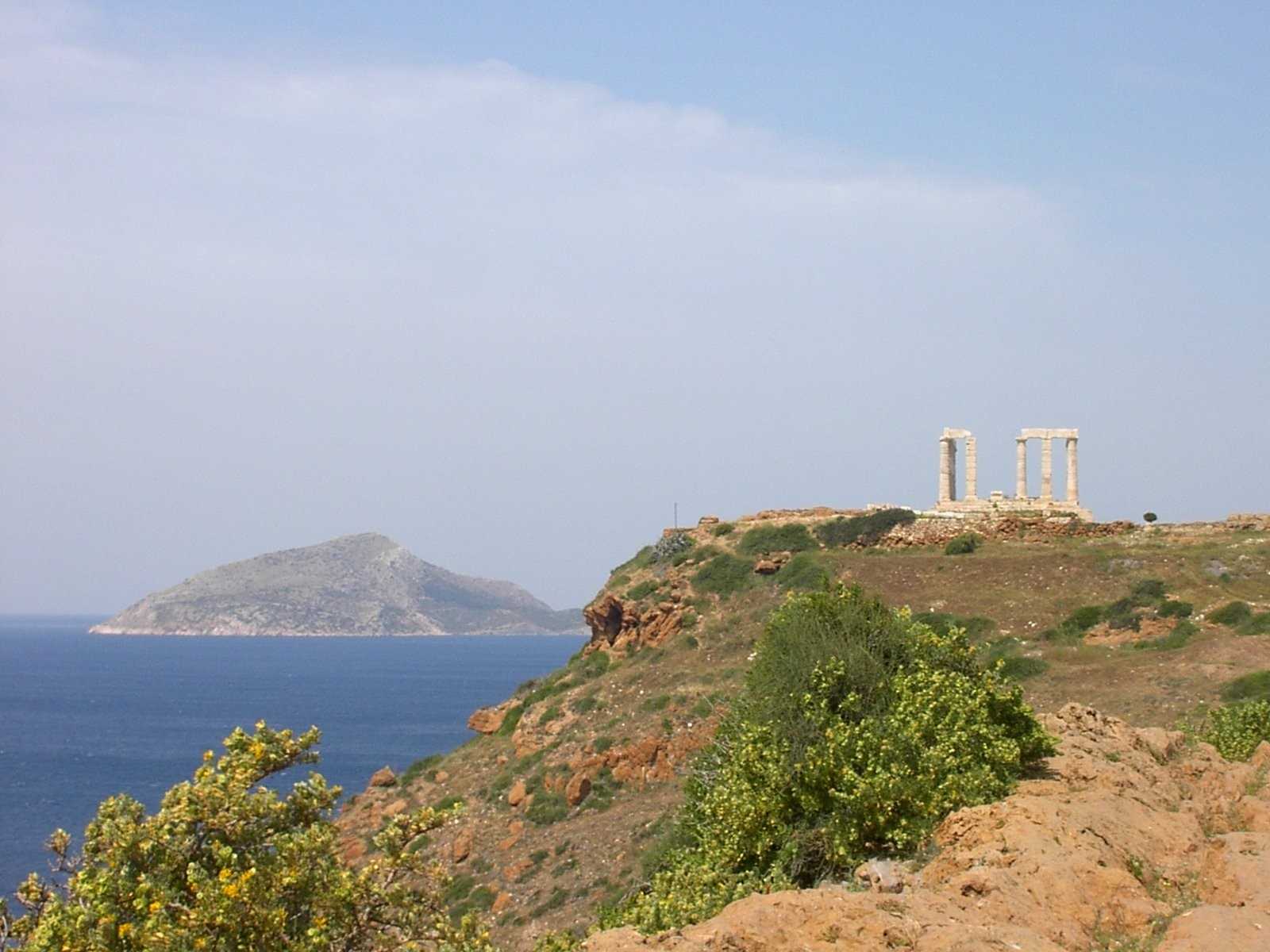
The Islands of the Aegean from Cape Sounion

=== History ===
Historians divide ancient Greek civilization into two eras, the Hellenic period (from around 900 BC to the death of Alexander the Great in 323 BC), and the Hellenistic period (323 BC – 30 AD). During the earlier Hellenic period, substantial works of architecture began to appear around 600 BC. During the later (Hellenistic) period, Greek culture spread as a result of Alexander's conquest of other lands, and later as a result of the rise of the Roman Empire, which adopted much of Greek culture.

Before the Hellenic era, two major cultures had dominated the region: the Minoan (c. 2800 – c. 1100 BC), and the Mycenaean (c. 1500–1100 BC). Minoan is the name given by modern historians to the culture of the people of ancient Crete, known for its elaborate and richly decorated Minoan palaces, and for its pottery, the most famous of which painted with floral and motifs of sea life. The Mycenaean culture, which flourished on the Peloponnesus, was different in character. Its people built citadels, fortifications and tombs, and decorated their pottery with bands of marching soldiers rather than octopus and seaweed. Both these civilizations came to an end around 1100 BC, that of Crete possibly because of volcanic devastation, and that of Mycenae because of an invasion by the Dorian people who lived on the Greek mainland. Following these events, there was a period from which only a village level of culture seems to have existed. This period is thus often referred to as the Greek Dark Age.

=== Art ===
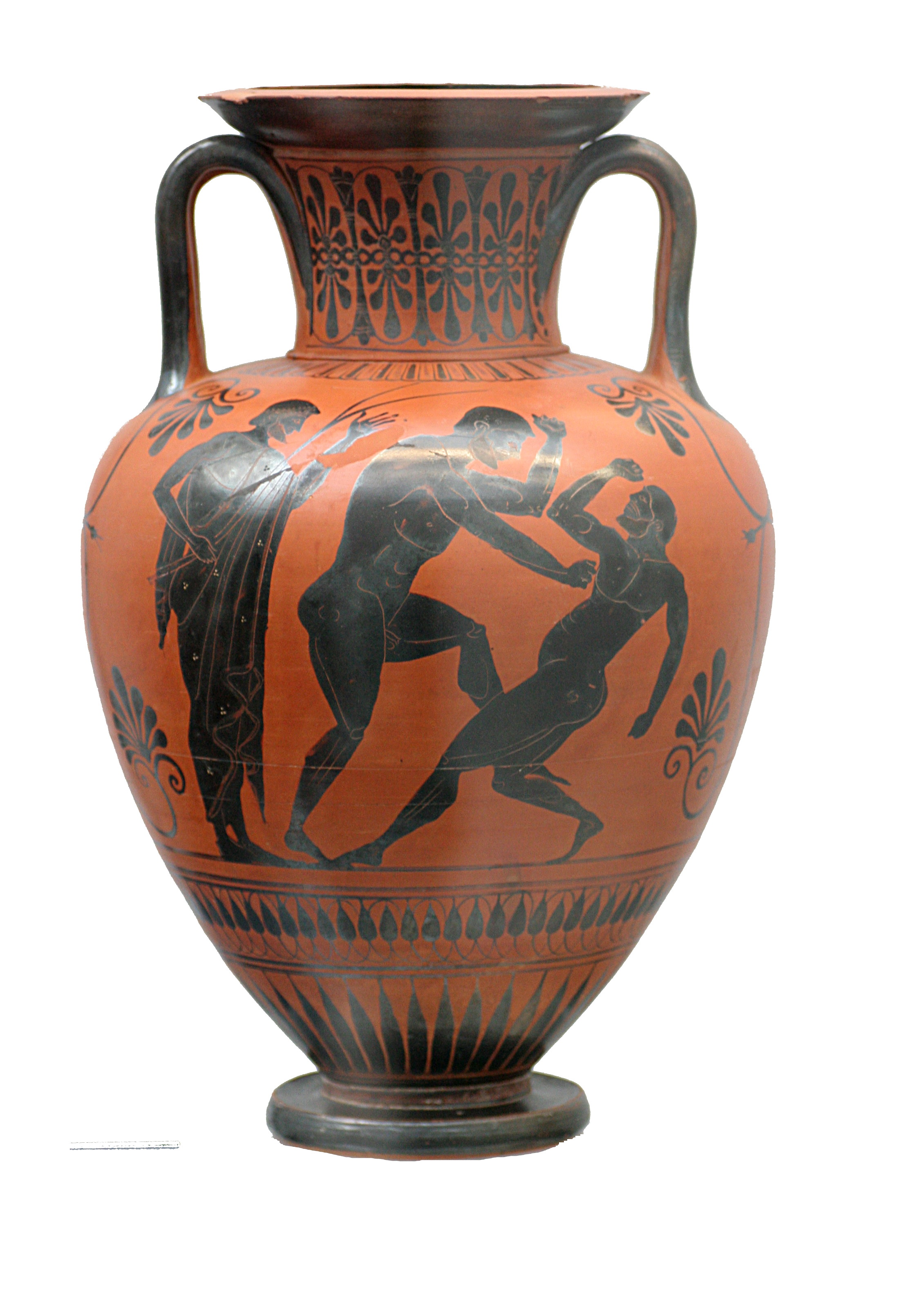
Black figure Amphora, Atalante painter (500–490 BC), shows proportion and style that are hallmarks of ancient Greek art

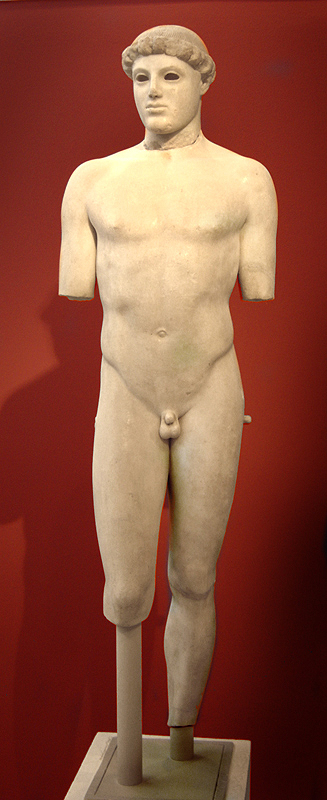
The Kritios Boy, (c. 480 BC), typifies the tradition of free-standing figures

The art of the Hellenic era is generally subdivided into four periods: the Protogeometric (1100–900 BC), the Geometric (900–700 BC), the Archaic (700–500 BC) and the Classical (500–323 BC) with sculpture being further divided into Severe Classical, High Classical and Late Classical. The first signs of the particular artistic character that defines ancient Greek architecture are to be seen in the pottery of the Dorian Greeks from the 10th century BC. Already at this period it is created with a sense of proportion, symmetry and balance not apparent in similar pottery from Crete and Mycenae. The decoration is precisely geometric, and ordered neatly into zones on defined areas of each vessel. These qualities were to manifest themselves not only through a millennium of Greek pottery making, but also in the architecture that was to emerge in the 6th century. The major development that occurred was in the growing use of the human figure as the major decorative motif, and the increasing surety with which humanity, its mythology, activities and passions were depicted.

The development in the depiction of the human form in pottery was accompanied by a similar development in sculpture. The tiny stylised bronzes of the Geometric period gave way to life-sized highly formalised monolithic representation in the Archaic period. The Classical period was marked by a rapid development towards idealised but increasingly lifelike depictions of gods in human form. This development had a direct effect on the sculptural decoration of temples, as many of the greatest extant works of ancient Greek sculpture once adorned temples, and many of the largest recorded statues of the age, such as the lost chryselephantine statues of Zeus at the Temple of Zeus at Olympia and Athena at the Parthenon, Athens, both over 40 feet high, were once housed in them.

=== Religion and philosophy ===
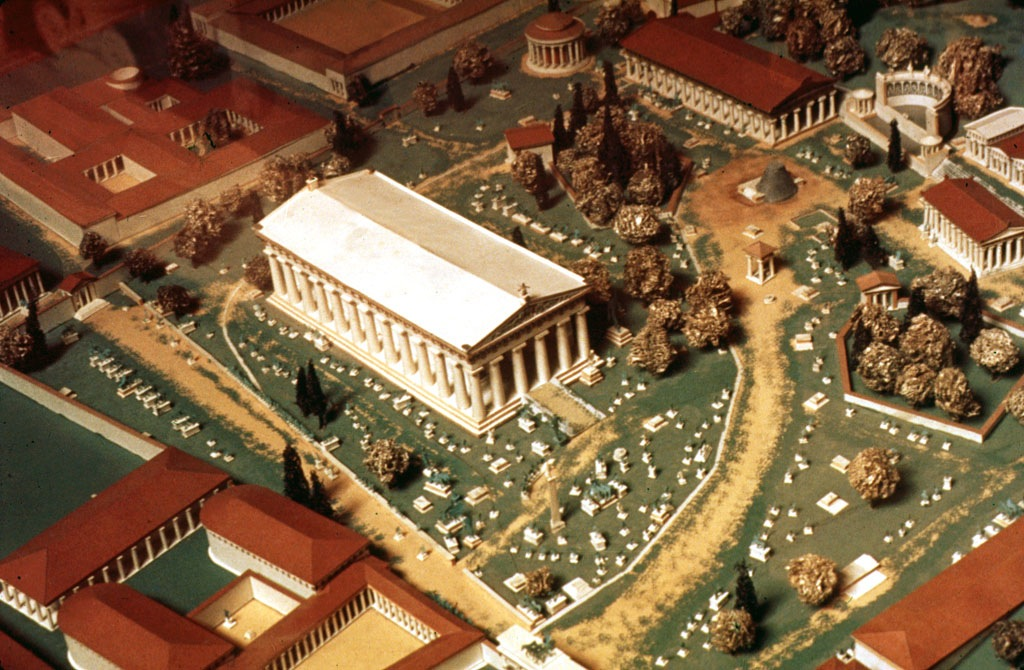
Above: Modern model of ancient Olympia with the Temple of Zeus at the centre

Right: Recreation of the colossal statue of Athena, once housed in the Parthenon, with sculptor Alan LeQuire

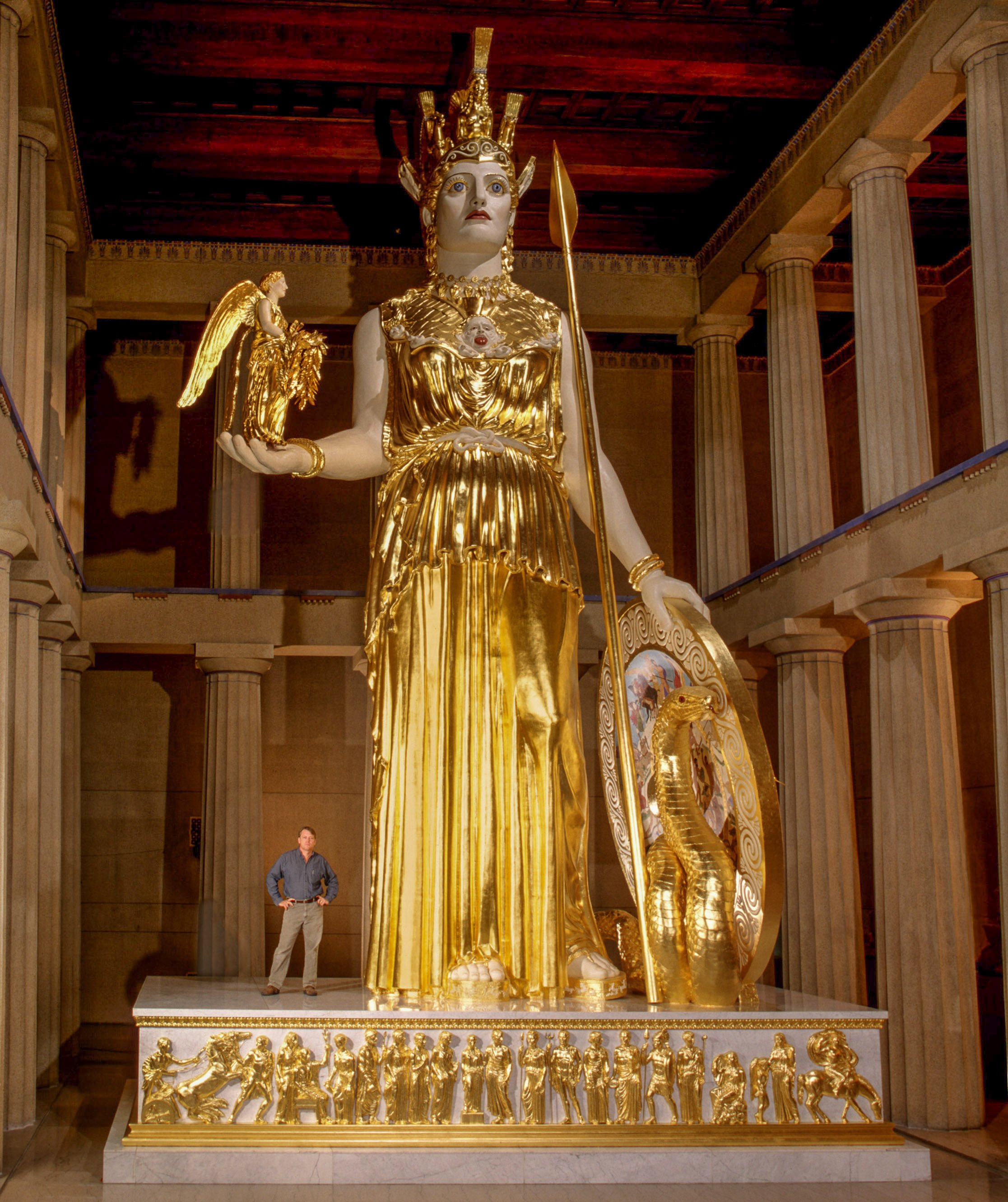

The religion of ancient Greece was a form of nature worship that grew out of the beliefs of earlier cultures. However, unlike earlier cultures, man was no longer perceived as being threatened by nature, but as its sublime product. The natural elements were personified as gods of the complete human form, and very human behaviour.

The home of the gods was thought to be Olympus, the highest mountain in Greece. The most important deities were: Zeus, the supreme god and ruler of the sky; Hera, his wife and goddess of marriage; Athena, goddess of wisdom; Poseidon, the god of the sea; Demeter, goddess of the harvest; Apollo, the god of the sun, law, healing, plague, reason, music and poetry; Artemis, goddess of chastity, the hunt and the wilderness; Aphrodite, goddess of love; Ares, God of war; Hermes, the god of trade and travellers, Hephaestus, the god of fire and metalwork; and Dionysus, the god of wine and fruit-bearing plants. Worship, like many other activities, was done in the community, in the open. However, by 600 BC, the gods were often represented by large statues and it was necessary to provide a building in which each of these could be housed. This led to the development of temples.

The ancient Greeks perceived order in the universe, and in turn, applied order and reason to their creations. Their humanist philosophy put mankind at the centre of things and promoted well-ordered societies and the development of democracy. At the same time, the respect for human intellect demanded a reason, and promoted a passion for enquiry, logic, challenge, and problem-solving. The architecture of the ancient Greeks, and in particular, temple architecture, responds to these challenges with a passion for beauty, and for order and symmetry which is the product of a continual search for perfection, rather than a simple application of a set of working rules.

== Architectural character ==
=== Early development ===
There is a clear division between the architecture of the preceding Mycenaean and Minoan cultures and that of the ancient Greeks, with much of the techniques and an understanding of their style being lost when these civilisations fell.

Mycenaean architecture is marked by massive fortifications, typically surrounding a citadel with a royal palace, much smaller than the rambling Minoan "palaces", and relatively few other buildings. The megaron, a rectangular hall with a hearth in the centre, was the largest room in the palaces, and also larger houses. Sun-dried brick above rubble bases were the usual materials, with wooden columns and roof-beams. Rows of ashlar stone orthostats lined the base of walls in some prominent locations.

The Minoan architecture of Crete was of the trabeated form like that of ancient Greece. It employed wooden columns with capitals, but the wooden columns were of a very different form to Doric columns, being narrow at the base and splaying upward. The earliest forms of columns in Greece seem to have developed independently. As with Minoan architecture, ancient Greek domestic architecture centred on open spaces or courtyards surrounded by colonnades. This form was adapted to the construction of hypostyle halls within the larger temples. The evolution that occurred in architecture was towards the public building, first and foremost the temple, rather than towards grand domestic architecture such as had evolved in Crete, if the Cretan "palaces" were indeed domestic, which remains uncertain.

Some Mycenaean tombs are marked by circular structures and tapered domes with flat-bedded, cantilevered courses. This architectural form did not carry over into the architecture of ancient Greece, but reappeared about 400 BC in the interior of large monumental tombs such as the Lion Tomb at Knidos (c. 350 BC).

=== Types of buildings ===
==== Domestic buildings ====
The Greek word for the family or household, oikos, is also the name for the house. Houses followed several different types. It is probable that many of the earliest houses were simple structures of two rooms, with an open porch or pronaos, above which rose a low pitched gable or pediment. This form is thought to have contributed to temple architecture.

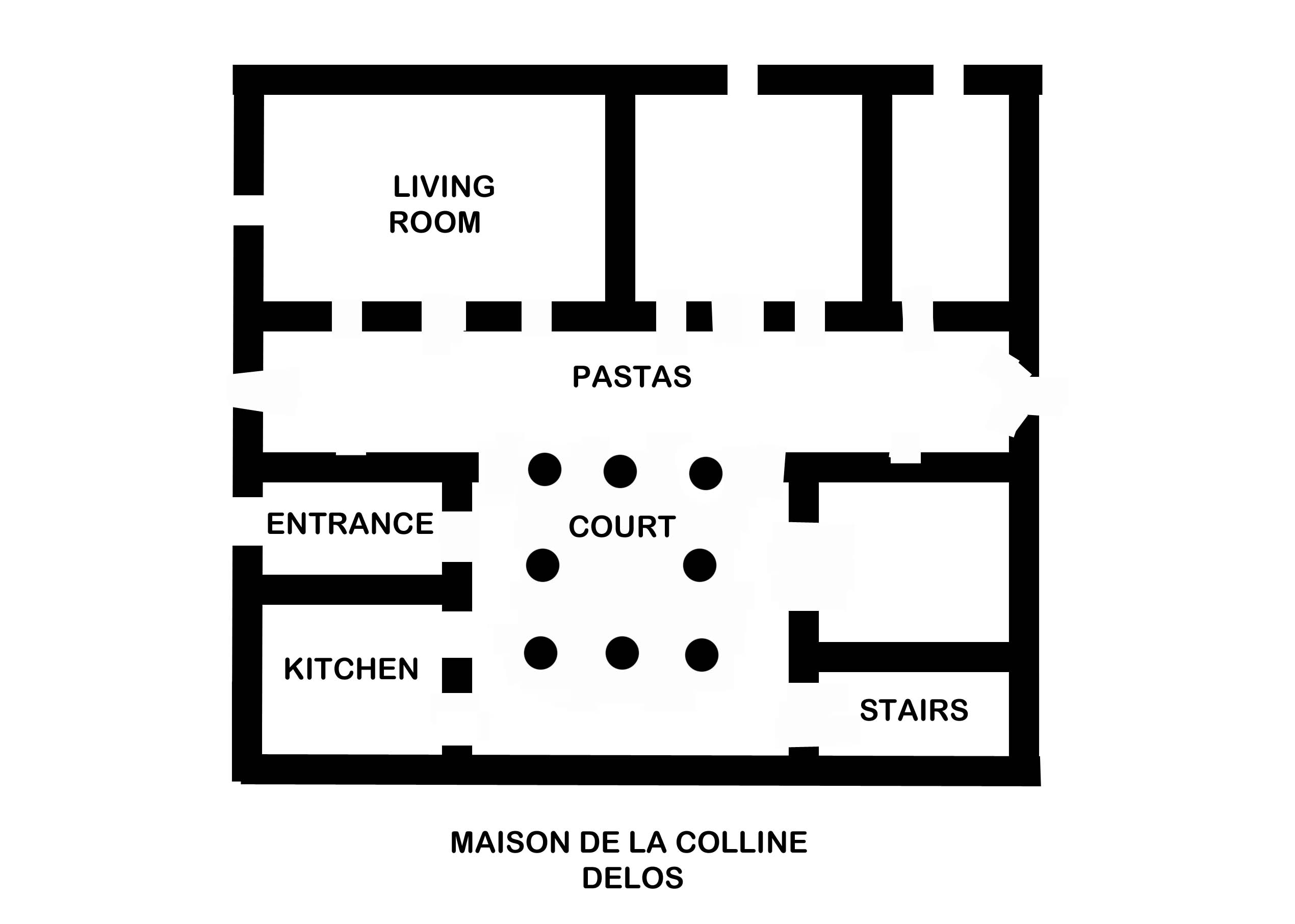
Plan of the House of Colline, 2nd century BC

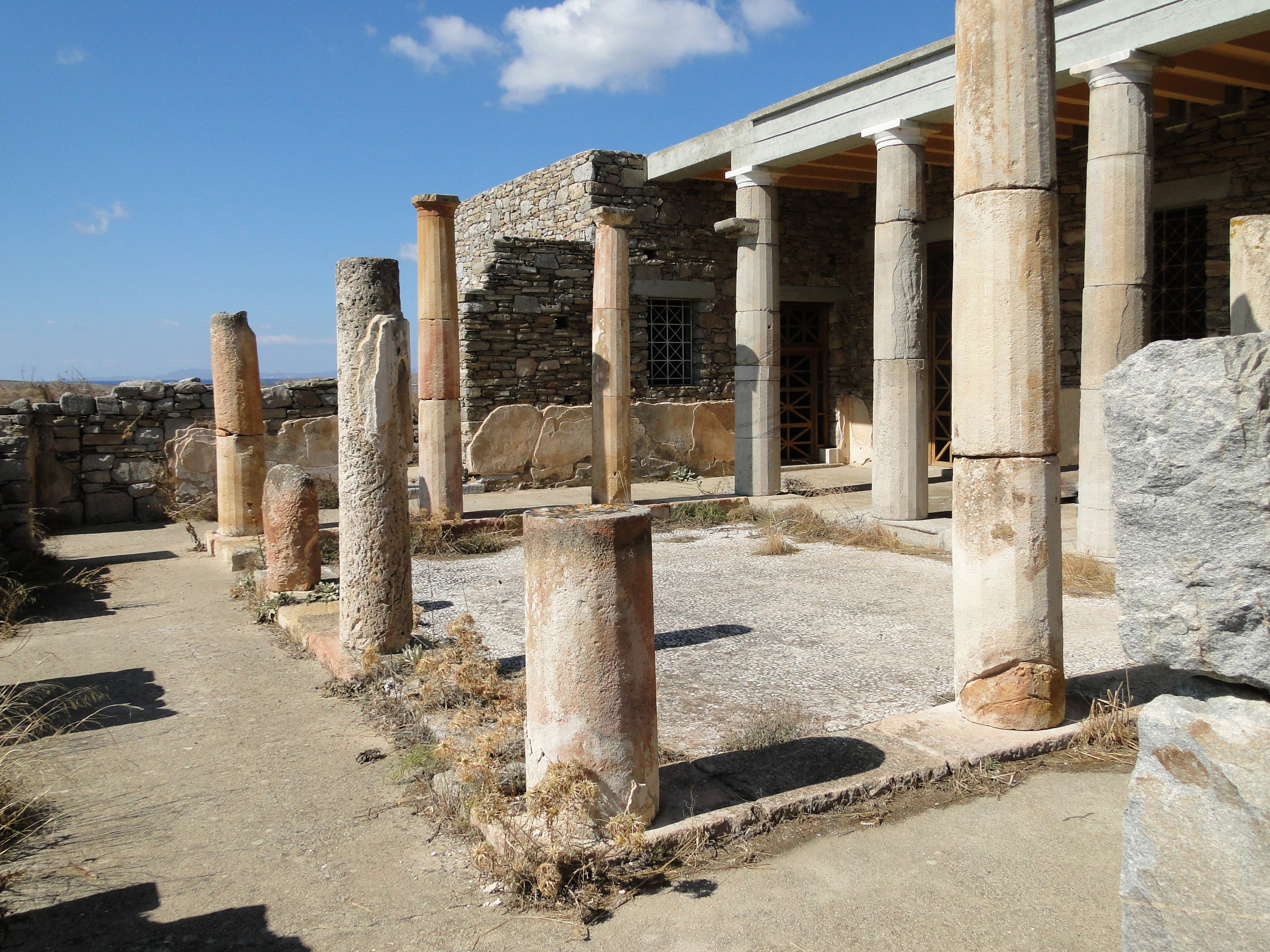
The House of Masks, Delos, 3rd century BC

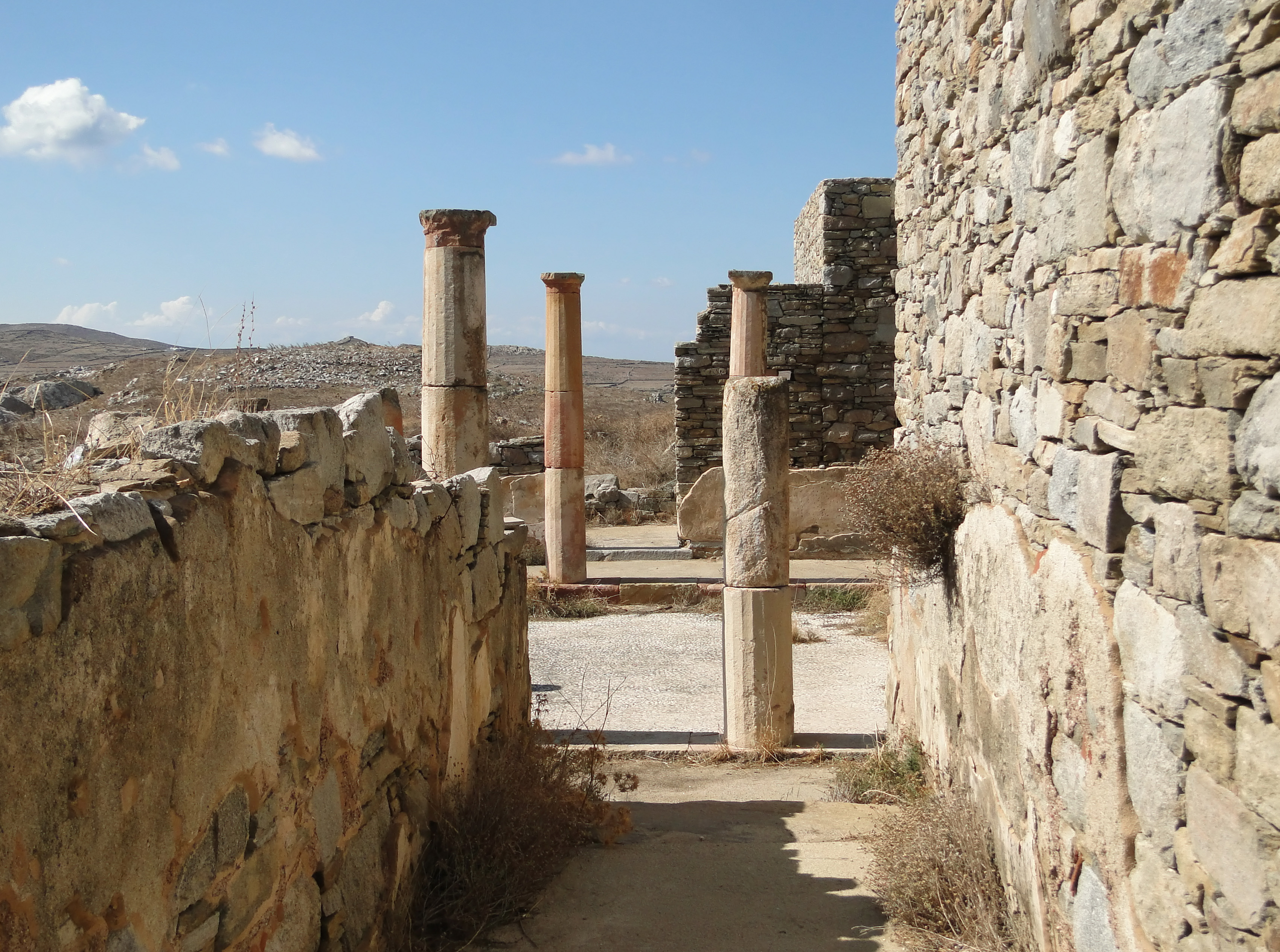
The House of Masks

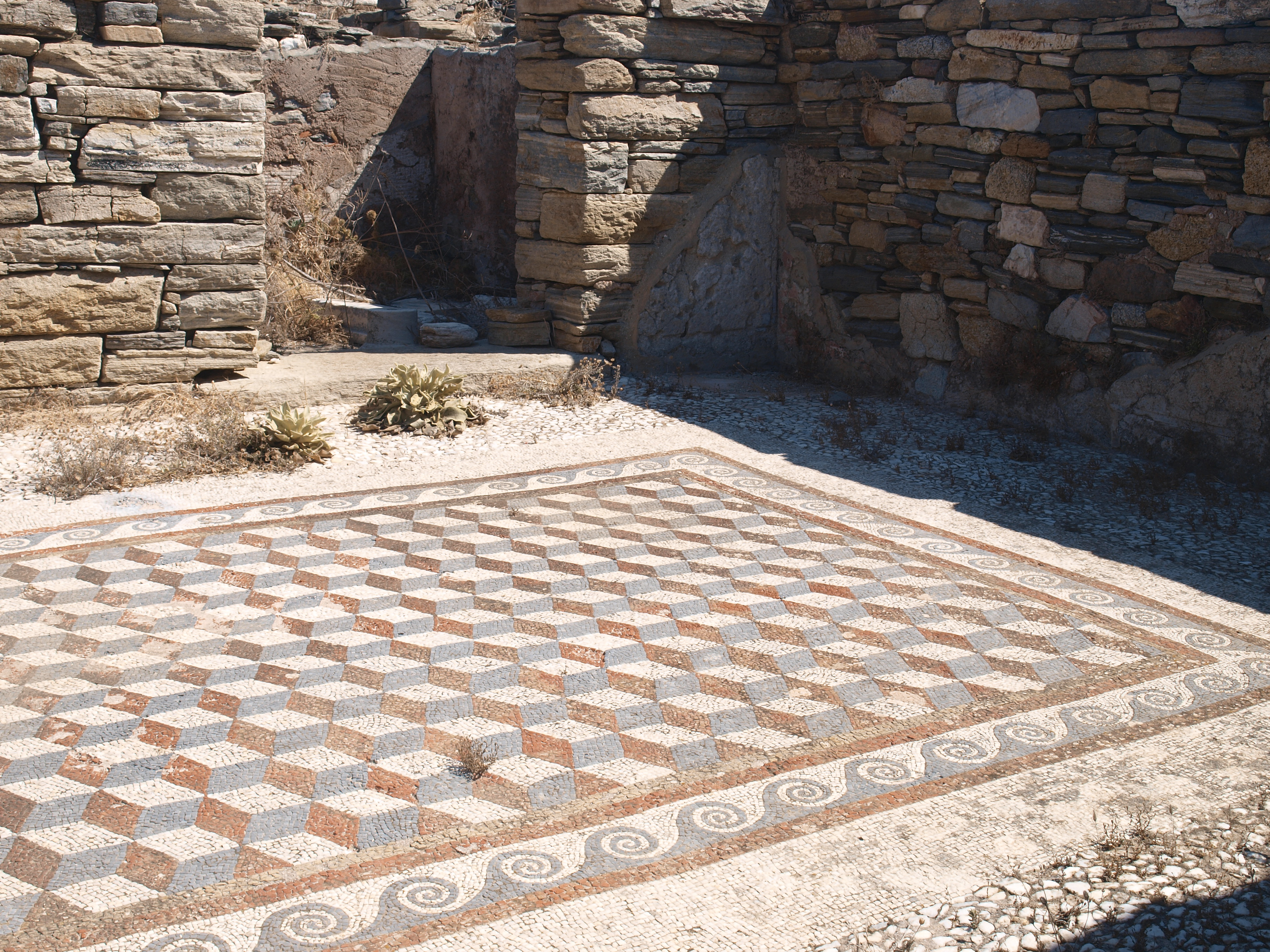
The mosaic floor of a house at Delos

The construction of many houses employed walls of sun-dried clay bricks or wooden framework filled with fibrous material such as straw or seaweed covered with clay or plaster, on a base of stone which protected the more vulnerable elements from damp. The roofs were probably of thatch with eaves which overhung the permeable walls. Many larger houses, such as those at Delos, were built of stone and plastered. The roofing material for the substantial house was tile. Houses of the wealthy had mosaic floors and demonstrated the Classical style.

Many houses centred on a wide passage or "pasta" which ran the length of the house and opened at one side onto a small courtyard which admitted light and air. Larger houses had a fully developed peristyle (courtyard) at the centre, with the rooms arranged around it. Some houses had an upper floor which appears to have been reserved for the use of the women of the family.

City houses were built with adjoining walls and were divided into small blocks by narrow streets. Shops were sometimes located in the rooms towards the street. City houses were inward-facing, with major openings looking onto the central courtyard, rather than the street.

==== Public buildings ====
The rectangular temple is the most common and best-known form of Greek public architecture. This rectilinear structure borrows from the Late Helladic, Mycenaean megaron, which contained a central throne room, vestibule, and porch. The temple did not serve the same function as a modern church, since the altar stood under the open sky in the temenos or sacred precinct, often directly before the temple. Temples served as the location of a cult image and as a storage place or strong room for the treasury associated with the cult of the god in question, and as a place for devotees of the god to leave their votive offerings, such as statues, helmets and weapons. Some Greek temples appear to have been oriented astronomically. The temple was generally part of a religious precinct known as the acropolis. According to Aristotle, "the site should be a spot seen far and wide, which gives good elevation to virtue and towers over the neighbourhood". Small circular temples, tholoi were also constructed, as well as small temple-like buildings that served as treasuries for specific groups of donors.

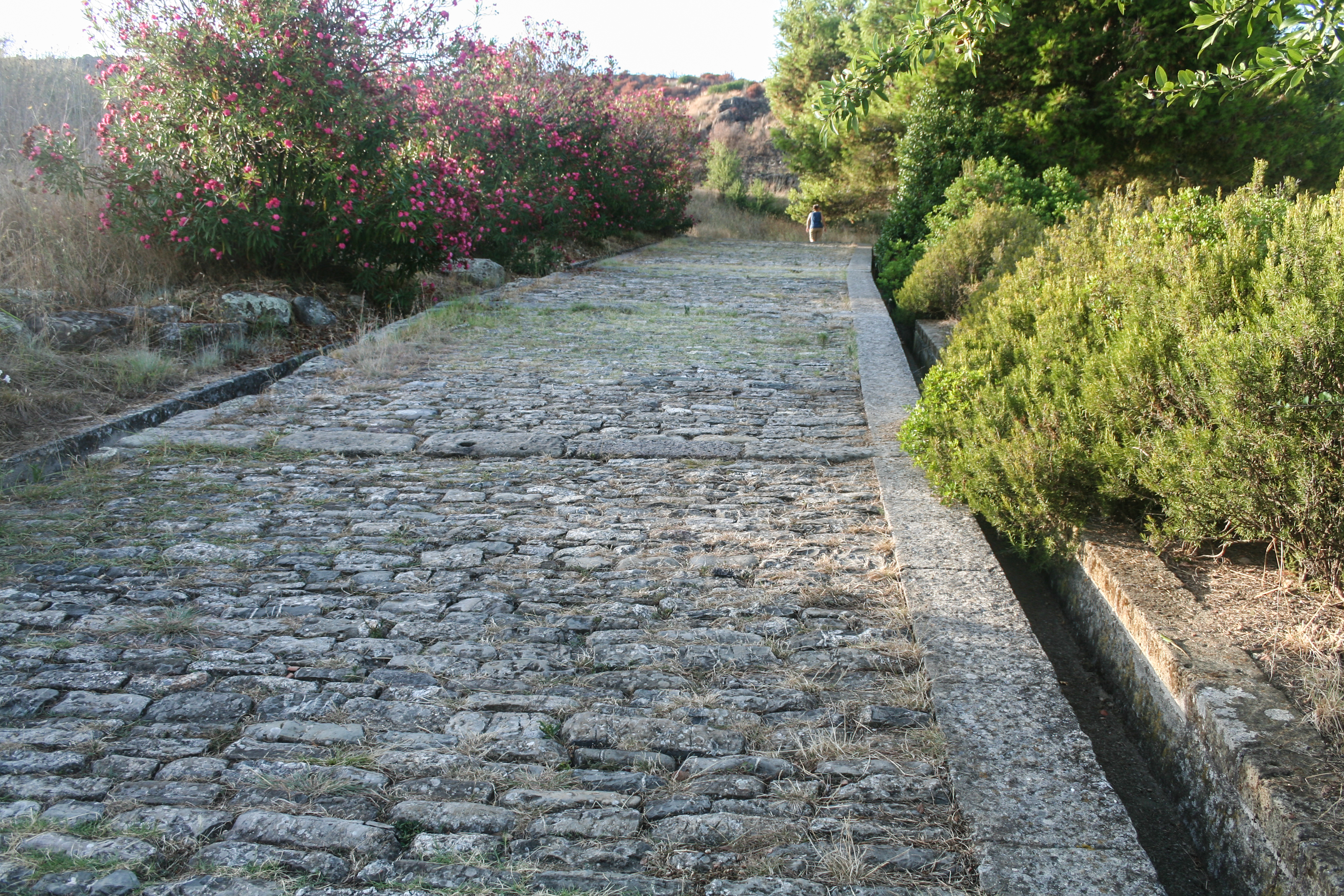
Porta Rosa, a street (3rd century BC) Velia, Italy

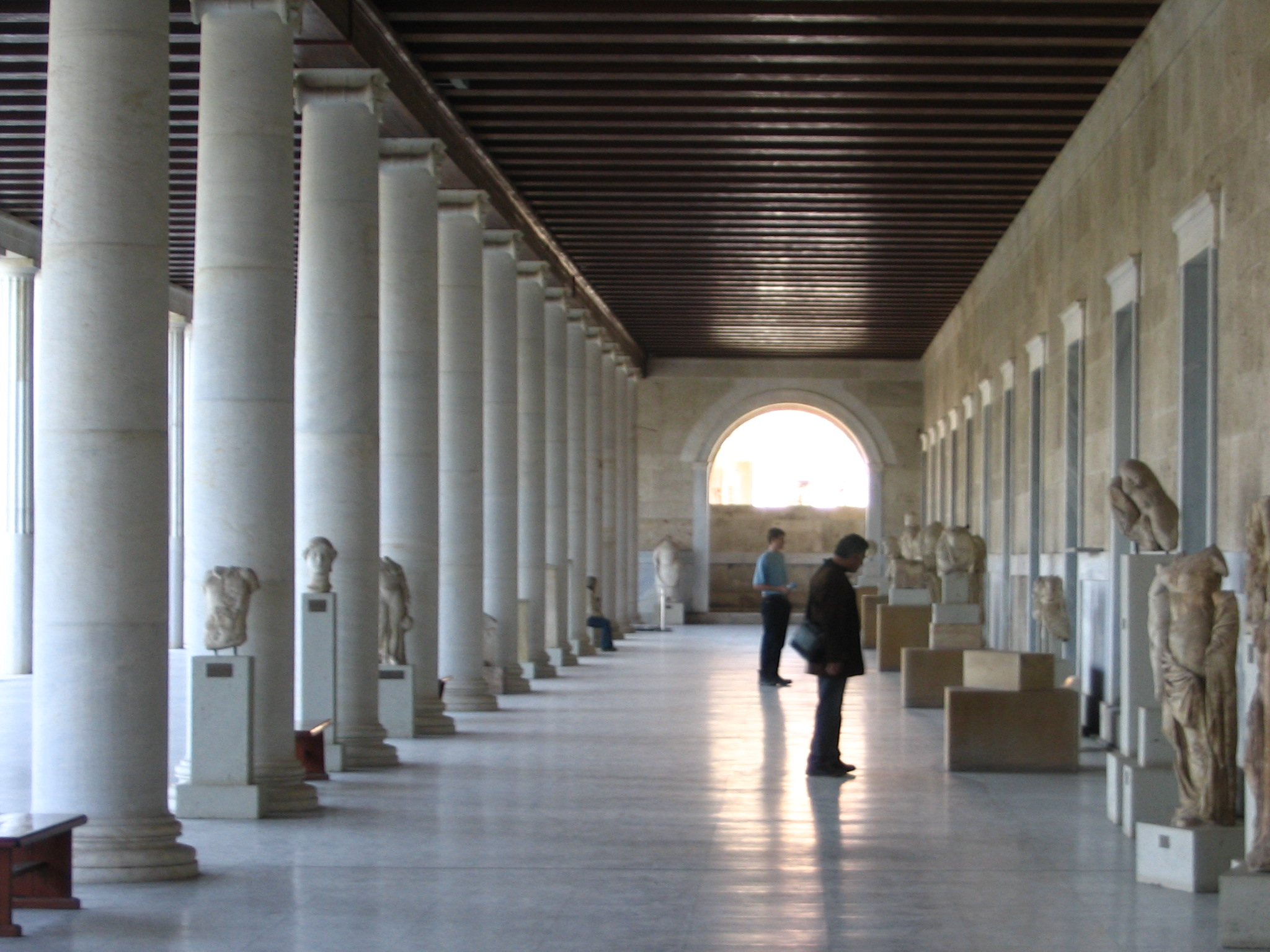
The reconstructed Stoa of Attalos, the Agora, Athens

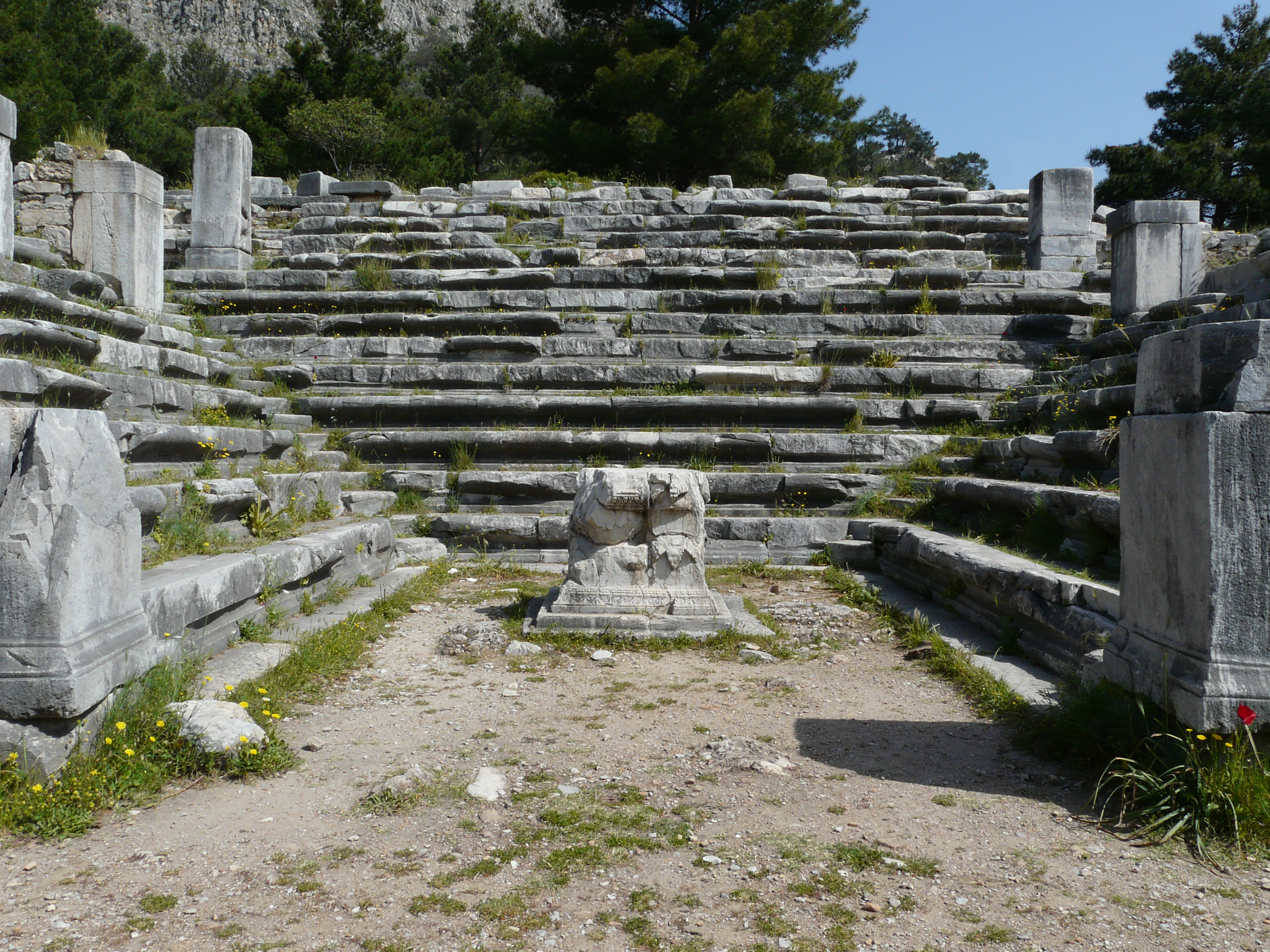
The Bouleuterion, at Priene

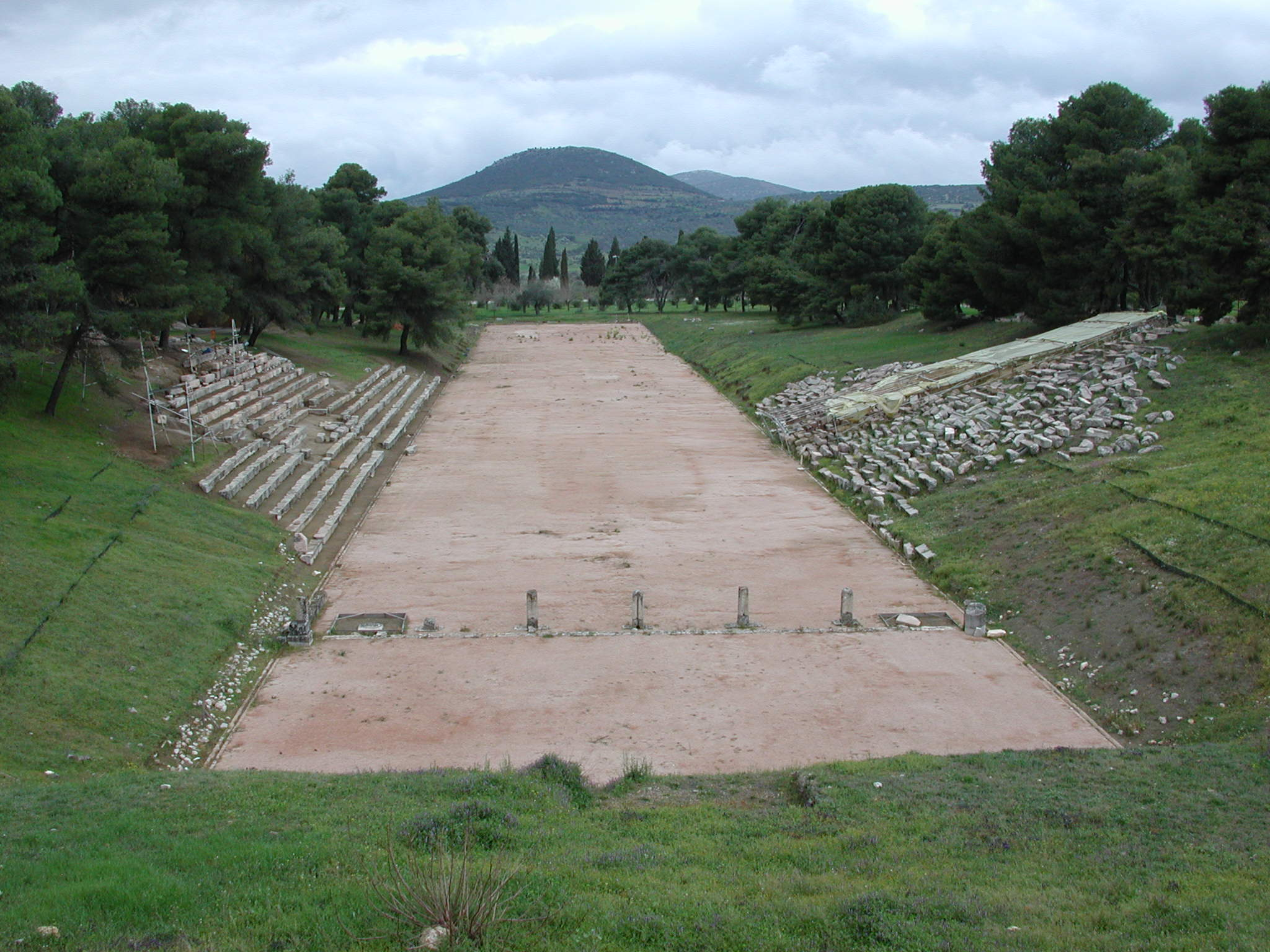
The Stadium at Epidauros

During the late 5th and 4th centuries BC, town planning became an important consideration of Greek builders, with towns such as Paestum and Priene being laid out with a regular grid of paved streets and an agora or central market place surrounded by a colonnade or stoa. The completely restored Stoa of Attalos can be seen in Athens. Towns were also equipped with a public fountain where water could be collected for household use. The development of regular town plans is associated with Hippodamus of Miletus, a pupil of Pythagoras.

Public buildings became "dignified and gracious structures", and were sited so that they related to each other architecturally. The propylon or porch, formed the entrance to temple sanctuaries and other significant sites with the best-surviving example being the Propylaea on the Acropolis of Athens. The bouleuterion was a large public building with a hypostyle hall that served as a court house and as a meeting place for the town council (boule). Remnants of bouleuterion survive at Athens, Olympia and Miletus, the latter having held up to 1,200 people.

Every Greek town had an open-air theatre. These were used for both public meetings as well as dramatic performances. The theatre was usually set in a hillside outside the town, and had rows of tiered seating set in a semicircle around the central performance area, the orchestra. Behind the orchestra was a low building called the skênê, which served as a store-room, a dressing room, and also as a backdrop to the action taking place in the orchestra. A number of Greek theatres survive almost intact, the best known being at Epidaurus by the architect Polykleitos the Younger.

Greek towns of substantial size also had a palaestra or a gymnasium, the social centre for male citizens which included spectator areas, baths, toilets and club rooms. Other buildings associated with sports include the hippodrome for horse racing, of which only remnants have survived, and the stadium for foot racing, 600 feet in length, of which examples exist at Olympia, Delphi, Epidaurus and Ephesus, while the Panathinaiko Stadium in Athens, which seats 45,000 people, was restored in the 19th century and was used in the 1896, 1906 and 2004 Olympic Games.

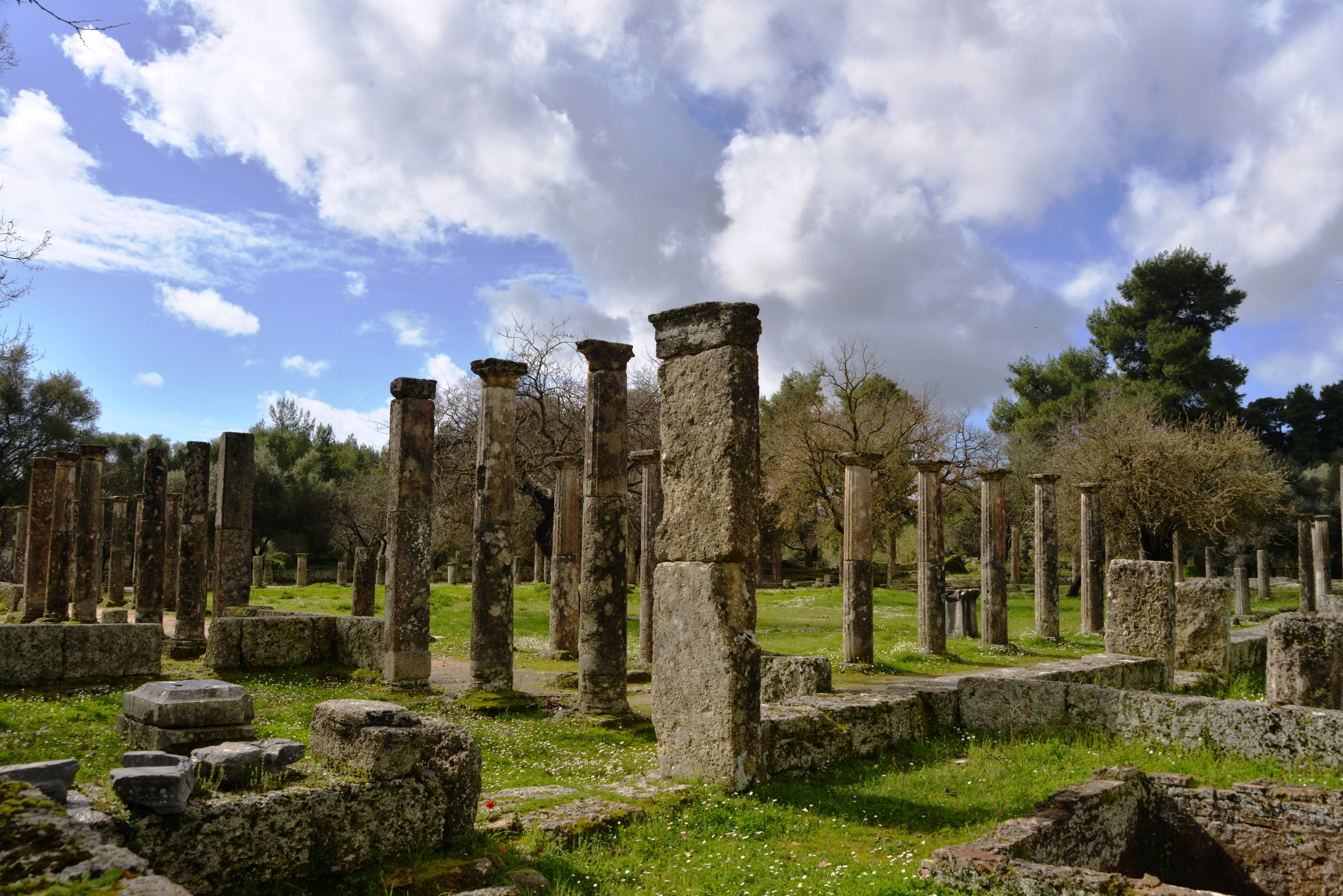
The Palaestra at Olympia, used for boxing and wrestling

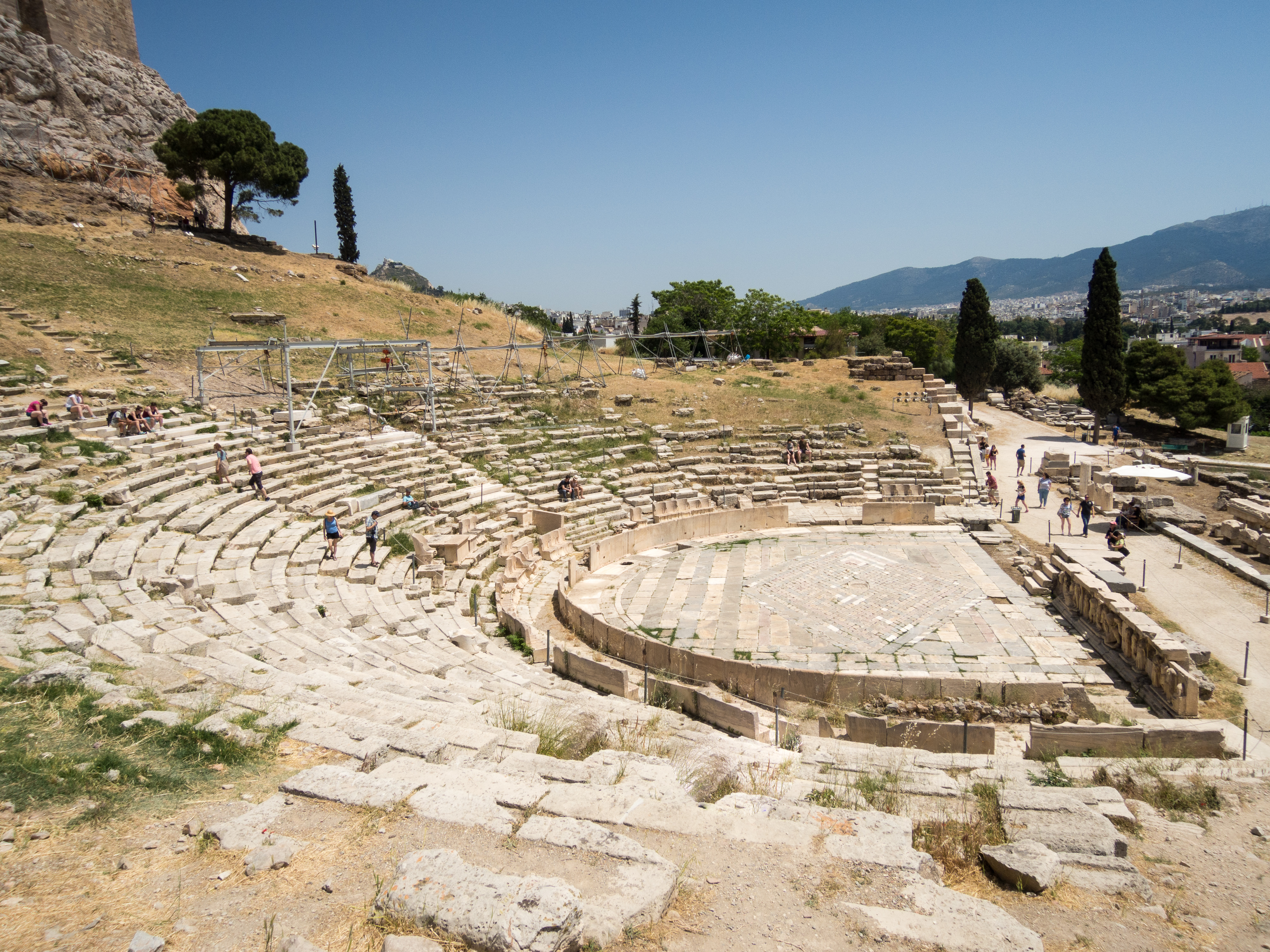
The Theatre of Dionysus, Athens

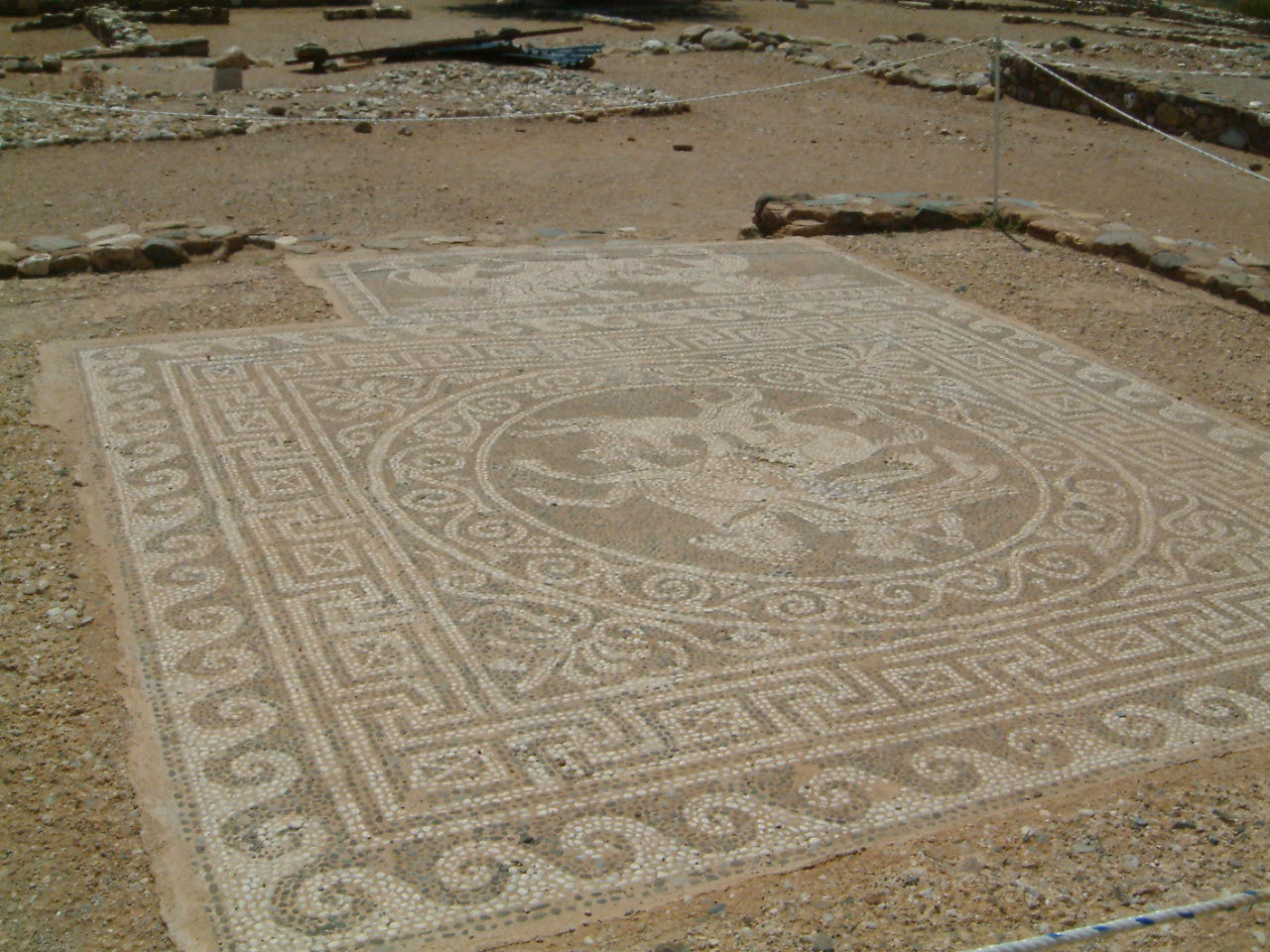
Pebble mosaic floor of a house at Olynthos, depicting Bellerophon

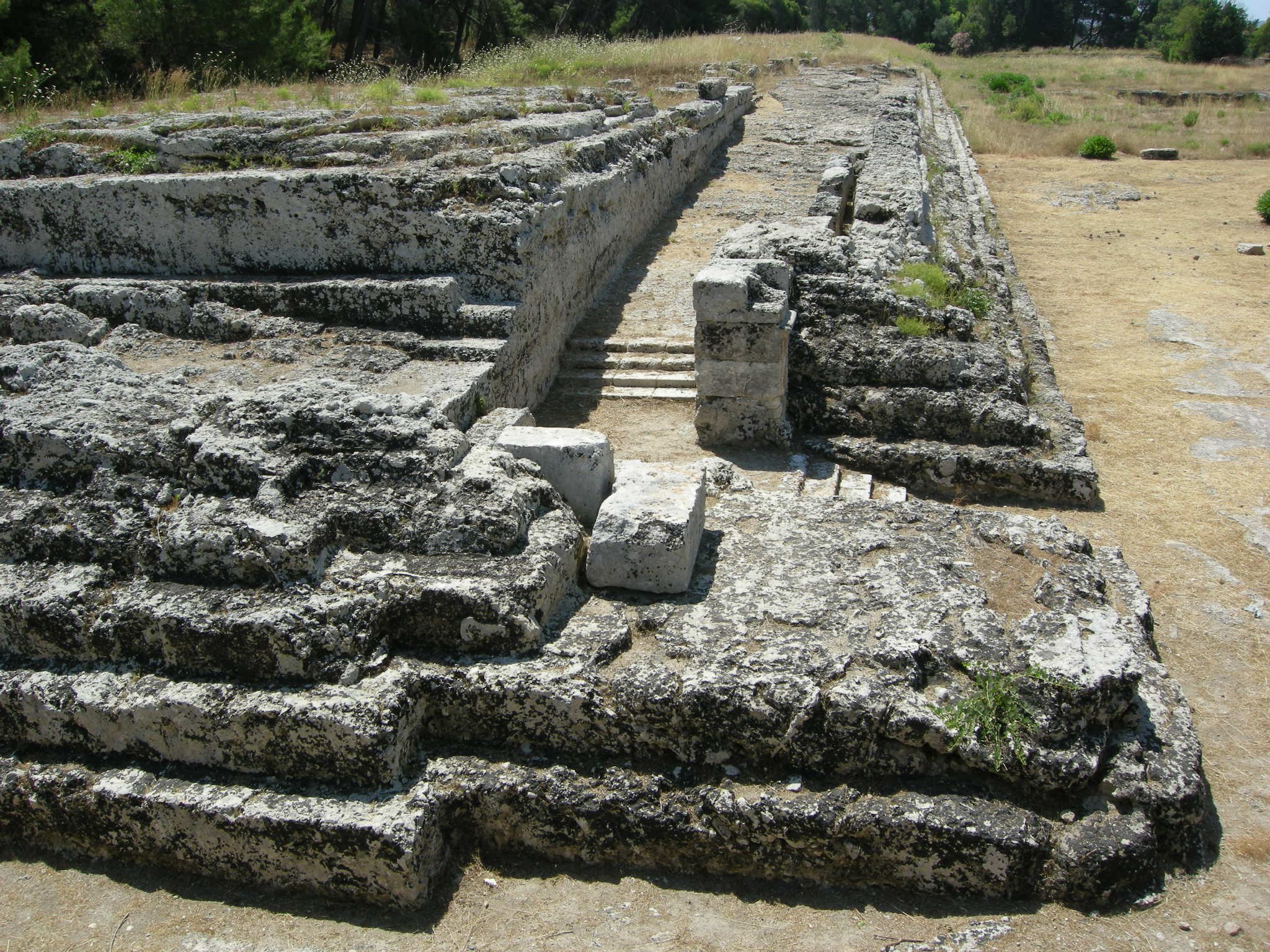
The altar of Hiero II at Syracuse

=== Structure ===
==== Post and lintel ====
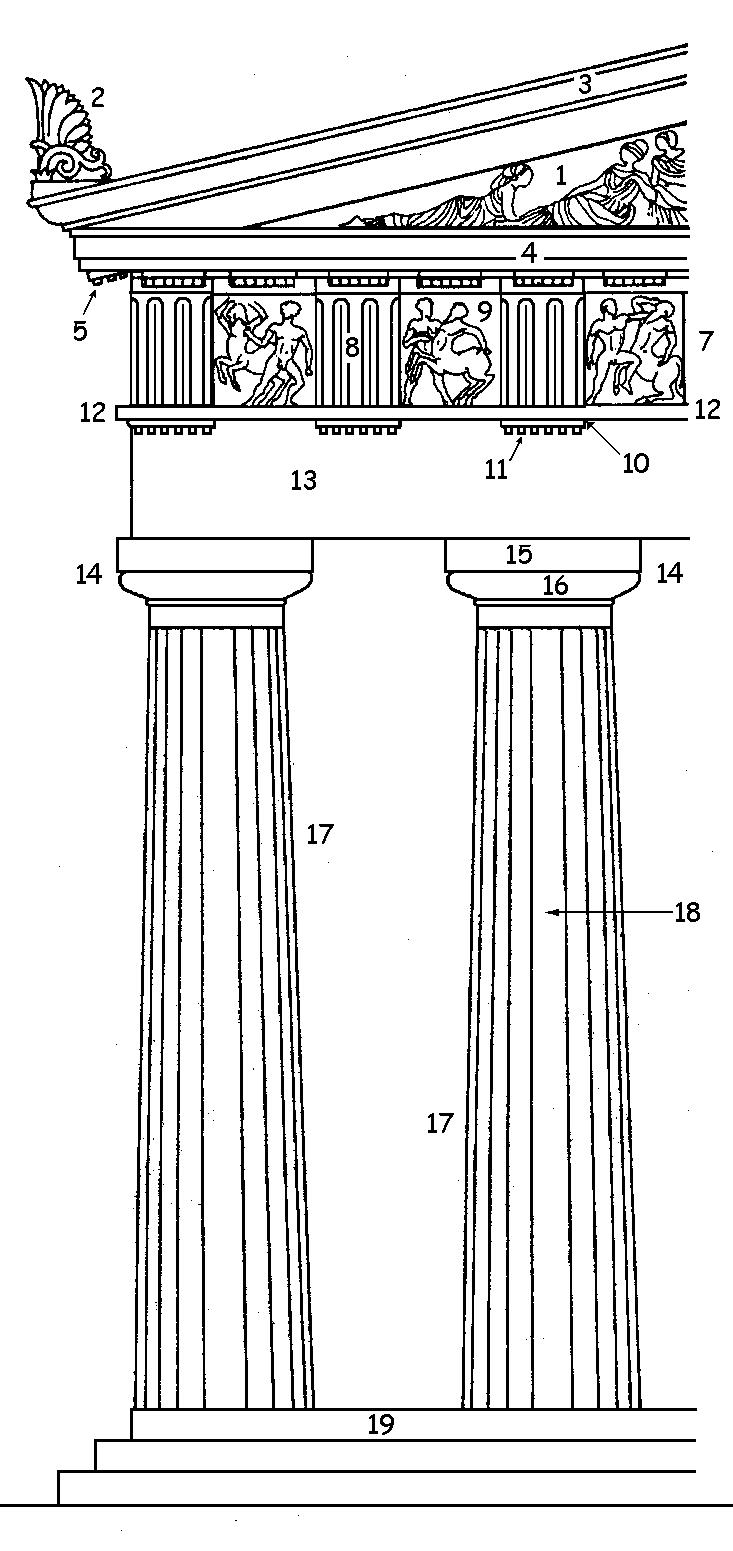
Parts of an Ancient Greek temple of the Doric Order: 1. Tympanum, 2. Acroterium, 3. Sima 4. Cornice 5. Mutules 7. Frieze 8. Triglyph 9. Metope; 10. Regula 11. Gutta 12. Taenia 13. Architrave 14. Capital 15. Abacus 16. Echinus 17. Column 18. Fluting 19. Stylobate

The architecture of ancient Greece is of a trabeated or "post and lintel" form, i.e. it is composed of upright beams (posts) supporting horizontal beams (lintels). Although the existent buildings of the era are constructed in stone, it is clear that the origin of the style lies in simple wooden structures, with vertical posts supporting beams which carried a ridged roof. The posts and beams divided the walls into regular compartments which could be left as openings, or filled with sun dried bricks, lathes or straw and covered with clay daub or plaster. Alternately, the spaces might be filled with rubble. It is likely that many early houses and temples were constructed with an open porch or "pronaos" above which rose a low pitched gable or pediment.

The earliest temples, built to enshrine statues of deities, were probably of wooden construction, later replaced by the more durable stone temples many of which are still in evidence today. The signs of the original timber nature of the architecture were maintained in the stone buildings.

A few of these temples are very large, with several, such as the Temple of Zeus Olympus and the Olympians at Athens being well over 300 feet in length, but most were less than half this size. It appears that some of the large temples began as wooden constructions in which the columns were replaced piecemeal as stone became available. This, at least was the interpretation of the historian Pausanias looking at the Temple of Hera at Olympia in the 2nd century AD.

The stone columns are made of a series of solid stone cylinders or "drums" that rest on each other without mortar, but were sometimes centred with a bronze pin. The columns are wider at the base than at the top, tapering with an outward curve known as entasis. Each column has a capital of two parts, the upper, on which rests the lintels, being square and called the abacus. The part of the capital that rises from the column itself is called the echinus. It differs according to the order, being plain in the Doric order, fluted in the Ionic and foliate in the Corinthian. Doric and usually Ionic capitals are cut with vertical grooves known as fluting. This fluting or grooving of the columns is a retention of an element of the original wooden architecture.

==== Entablature and pediment ====
The columns of a temple support a structure that rises in two main stages, the entablature and the pediment.

The entablature is the major horizontal structural element supporting the roof and encircling the entire building. It is composed of three parts. Resting on the columns is the architrave made of a series of stone "lintels" that spanned the space between the columns, and meet each other at a joint directly above the centre of each column.

Above the architrave is a second horizontal stage called the frieze. The frieze is one of the major decorative elements of the building and carries a sculptured relief. In the case of Ionic and Corinthian architecture, the relief decoration runs in a continuous band, but in the Doric order, it is divided into sections called metopes, which fill the spaces between vertical rectangular blocks called triglyphs. The triglyphs are vertically grooved like the Doric columns, and retain the form of the wooden beams that would once have supported the roof.

The upper band of the entablature is called the cornice, which is generally ornately decorated on its lower edge. The cornice retains the shape of the beams that would once have supported the wooden roof at each end of the building. At the front and rear of each temple, the entablature supports a triangular structure called the pediment. The tympanum is the triangular space framed by the cornices and the location of the most significant sculptural decoration on the exterior of the building.

==== Masonry ====
Every temple rested on a masonry base called the crepidoma, generally of three steps, of which the upper one which carried the columns was the stylobate. Masonry walls were employed for temples from about 600 BC onwards. Masonry of all types was used for ancient Greek buildings, including rubble, but the finest ashlar masonry was usually employed for temple walls, in regular courses and large sizes to minimise the joints. The blocks were rough hewn and hauled from quarries to be cut and bedded very precisely, with mortar hardly ever being used. Blocks, particularly those of columns and parts of the building bearing loads were sometimes fixed in place or reinforced with iron clamps, dowels and rods of wood, bronze or iron fixed in lead to minimise corrosion.

==== Openings ====
Door and window openings were spanned with a lintel, which in a stone building limited the possible width of the opening. The distance between columns was similarly affected by the nature of the lintel, columns on the exterior of buildings and carrying stone lintels being closer together than those on the interior, which carried wooden lintels. Door and window openings narrowed towards the top. Temples were constructed without windows, the light to the naos entering through the door. It has been suggested that some temples were lit from openings in the roof. A door of the Ionic Order at the Erechtheion (17 feet high and 7.5 feet wide at the top) retains many of its features intact, including mouldings, and an entablature supported on console brackets. (See Architectural Decoration, below)

Structure, masonry, openings and roof of Greek temples

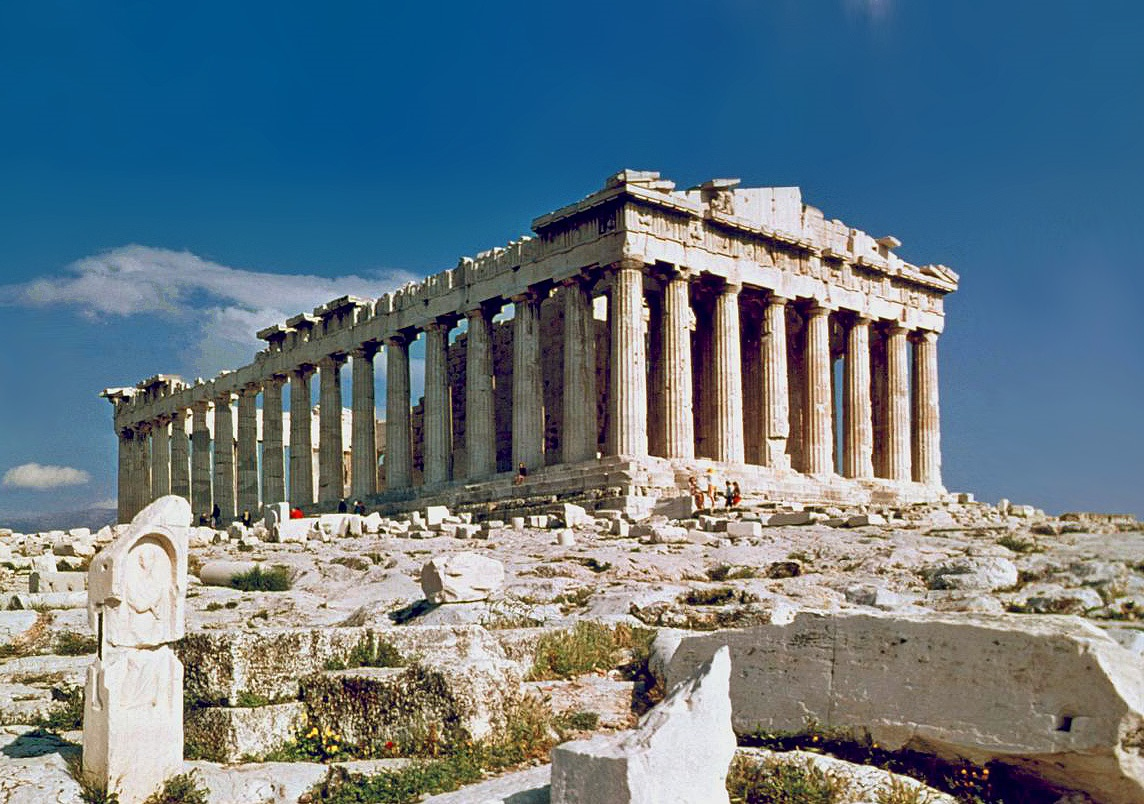
The Parthenon, shows the common structural features of Ancient Greek architecture: crepidoma, columns, entablature, pediment.

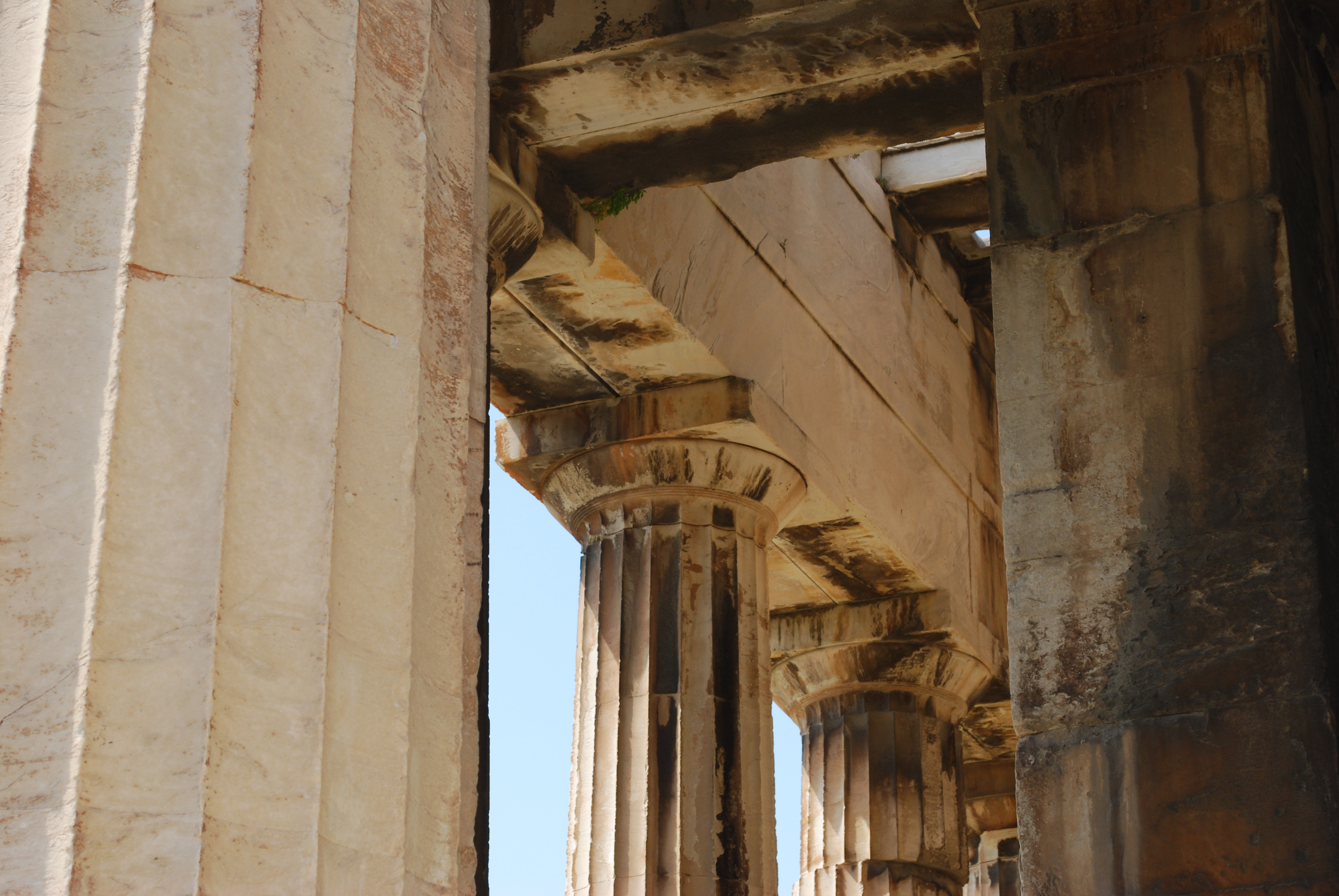
Temple of Hephaestos, fluted Doric columns with abacuses supporting double beams of the architrave

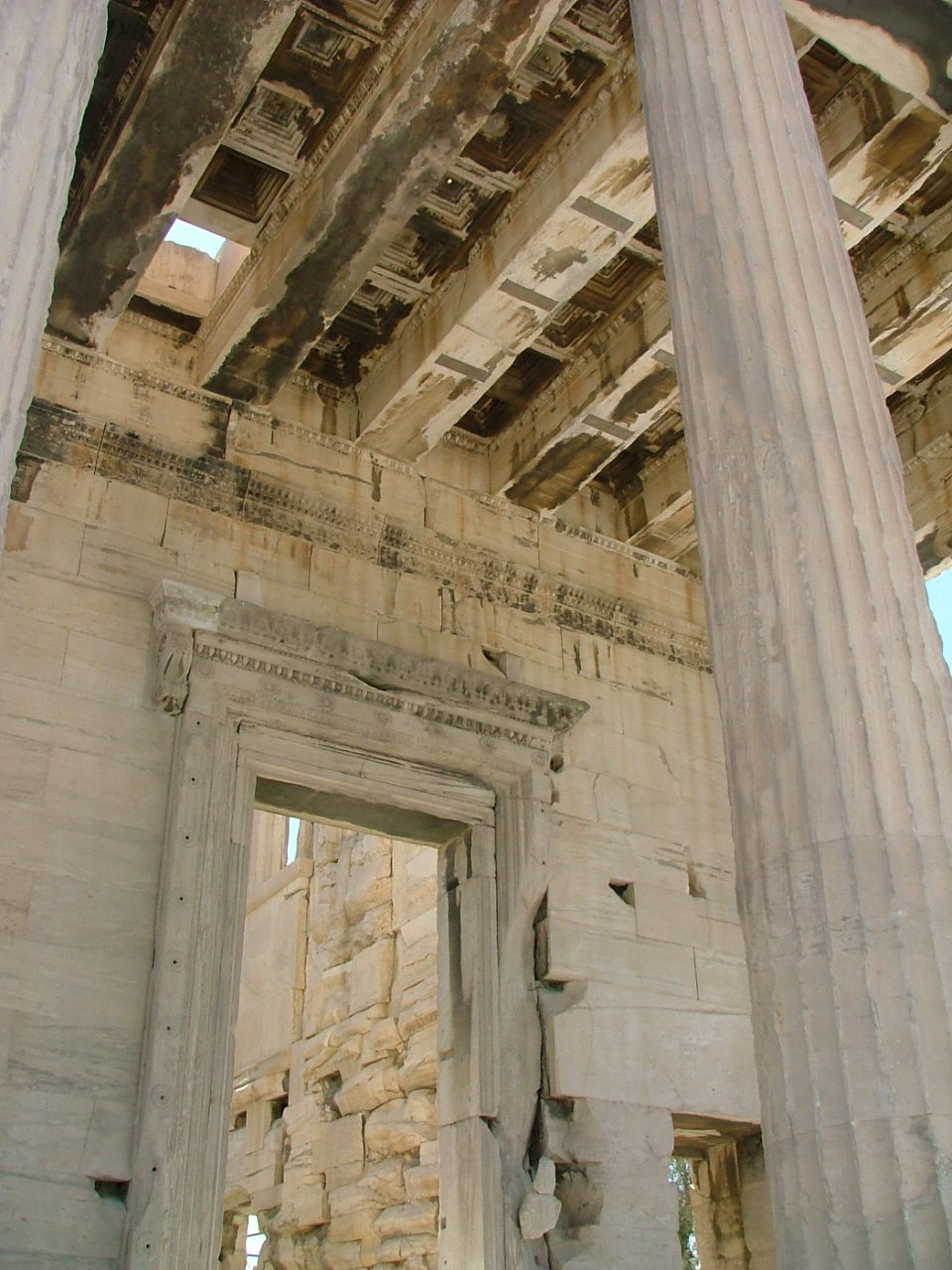
Erechtheion: masonry, door, stone lintels, coffered ceiling panels

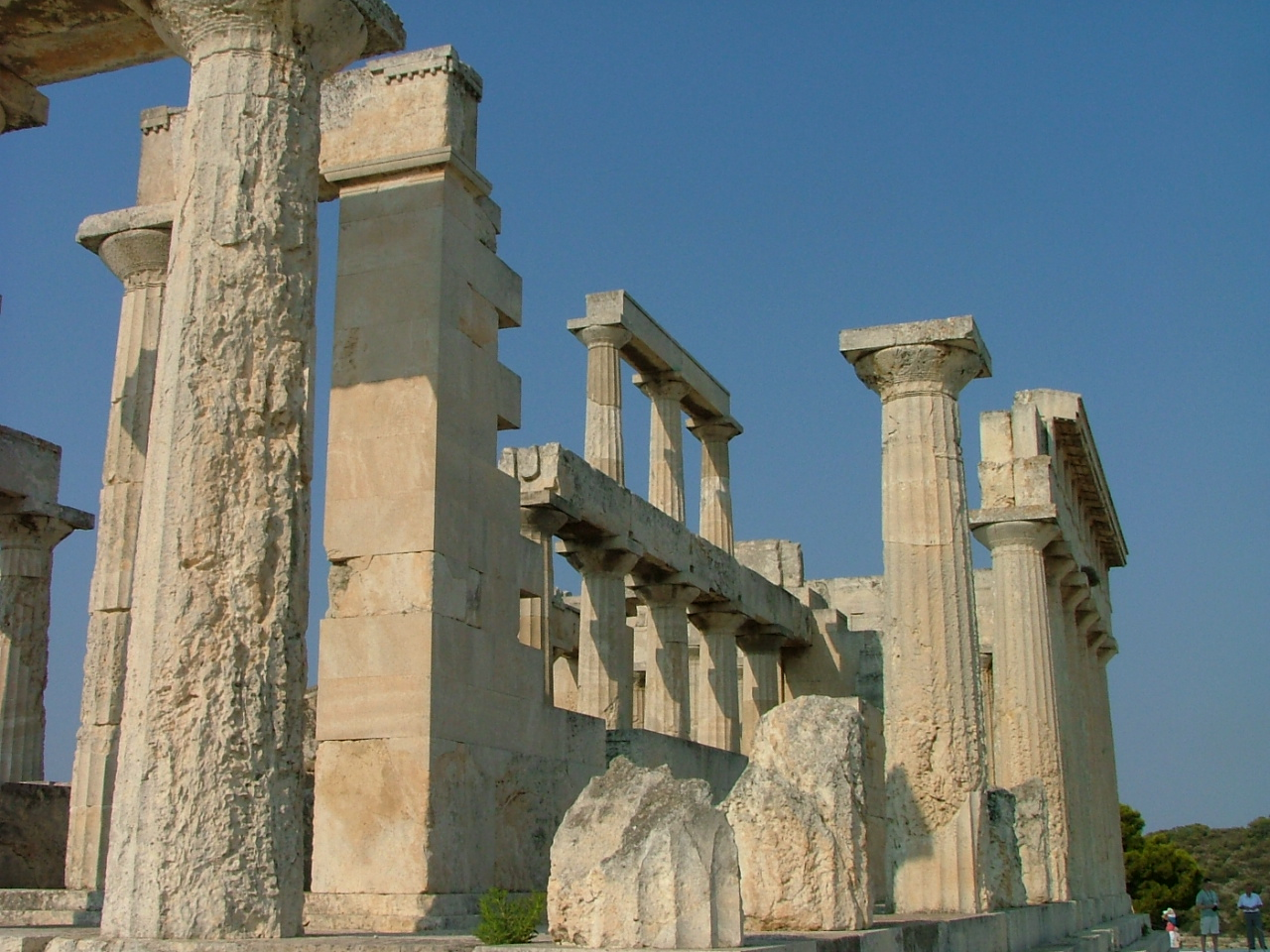
At the Temple of Aphaia, the hypostyle columns rise in two tiers, to a height greater than the walls, to support a roof without struts.

==== Roof ====
The widest span of a temple roof was across the cella, or inner chamber. In a large building, this space contains columns to support the roof, the architectural form being known as hypostyle. It appears that, although the architecture of ancient Greece was initially of wooden construction, the early builders did not have the concept of the diagonal truss as a stabilising member. This is evidenced by the nature of temple construction in the 6th century BC, where the rows of columns supporting the roof of the cella rise higher than the outer walls, unnecessary if roof trusses are employed as an integral part of the wooden roof. The indication is that initially all the rafters were supported directly by the entablature, walls and hypostyle, rather than on a trussed wooden frame, which came into use in Greek architecture only in the 3rd century BC.

Ancient Greek buildings of timber, clay and plaster construction were probably roofed with thatch. With the rise of stone architecture came the appearance of fired ceramic roof tiles. These early roof tiles showed an S-shape, with the pan and cover tile forming one piece. They were much larger than modern roof tiles, being up to 90 cm (35.43 in) long, 70 cm (27.56 in) wide, 3–4 cm (1.18–1.57 in) thick and weighing around 30 kg (66 lb) apiece. Only stone walls, which were replacing the earlier mudbrick and wood walls, were strong enough to support the weight of a tiled roof.

The earliest finds of roof tiles of the Archaic period in Greece are documented from a very restricted area around Corinth, where fired tiles began to replace thatched roofs at the temples of Apollo and Poseidon between 700 and 650 BC. Spreading rapidly, roof tiles were within fifty years in evidence for a large number of sites around the Eastern Mediterranean, including Mainland Greece, Western Asia Minor, Southern and Central Italy. Being more expensive and labour-intensive to produce than thatch, their introduction has been explained by the fact that their fireproof quality would have given desired protection to the costly temples. As a side-effect, it has been assumed that the new stone and tile construction also ushered in the end of overhanging eaves in Greek architecture, as they made the need for an extended roof as rain protection for the mudbrick walls obsolete.

Vaults and arches were not generally used, but begin to appear in tombs (in a "beehive" or cantilevered form such as used in Mycenaea) and occasionally, as an external feature, exedrae of voussoired construction from the 5th century BC. The dome and vault never became significant structural features, as they were to become in ancient Roman architecture.

==== Temple plans ====
Plans of ancient Greek temples Top: 1. distyle in antis, 2. amphidistyle in antis, 3. tholos, 4. prostyle tetrastyle, 5. amphiprostyle tetrastyle, Bottom: 6. dipteral octastyle, 7. peripteral hexastyle, 8. pseudoperipteral hexastyle, 9. pseudodipteral octastyle

Most ancient Greek temples were rectangular, and were approximately twice as long as they were wide, with some notable exceptions such as the enormous Temple of Olympian Zeus, Athens, with a length of nearly 2 1/2 times its width. A number of surviving temple-like structures are circular, and are referred to as tholos. The smallest temples are less than 25 metres (approx. 75 feet) in length, or in the case of the circular tholos, in diameter. The great majority of temples are between 30 and 60 metres (approx. 100–200 feet) in length. A small group of Doric temples, including the Parthenon, are between 60 and 80 metres (approx. 200–260 feet) in length. The largest temples, mainly Ionic and Corinthian, but including the Doric Temple of the Olympian Zeus, Agrigento, were between 90 and 120 metres (approx. 300–390 feet) in length.

The temple rises from a stepped base or stylobate, which elevates the structure above the ground on which it stands. Early examples, such as the Temple of Zeus at Olympus, have two steps, but the majority, like the Parthenon, have three, with the exceptional example of the Temple of Apollo at Didyma having six. The core of the building is a masonry-built "naos" within which is a cella, a windowless room originally housing the statue of the god. The cella generally has a porch or "pronaos" before it, and perhaps a second chamber or "antenaos" serving as a treasury or repository for trophies and gifts. The chambers were lit by a single large doorway, fitted with a wrought iron grill. Some rooms appear to have been illuminated by skylights.

On the stylobate, often completely surrounding the naos, stand rows of columns. Each temple is defined as being of a particular type, with two terms: one describing the number of columns across the entrance front, and the other defining their distribution.

Examples:

- Distyle in antis describes a small temple with two columns at the front, which are set between the projecting walls of the pronaos or porch, like the Temple of Nemesis at Rhamnus. (see above, figure 1.)
- Amphiprostyle tetrastyle describes a small temple that has columns at both ends which stand clear of the naos. Tetrastyle indicates that the columns are four in number, like those of the Temple on the Ilissus in Athens. (figure 4.)
- Peripteral hexastyle describes a temple with a single row of peripheral columns around the naos, with six columns across the front, like the Theseion in Athens. (figure 7.)
- Peripteral octastyle describes a temple with a single row of columns around the naos, (figure 7.) with eight columns across the front, like the Parthenon, Athens. (figures 6 and 9.)
- Dipteral decastyle describes the huge temple of Apollo at Didyma, with the naos surrounded by a double row of columns, (figure 6.) with ten columns across the entrance front.
- The Temple of Zeus Olympius at Agrigentum, is termed Pseudo-periteral heptastyle, because its encircling colonnade has pseudo columns that are attached to the walls of the naos. (figure 8.) Heptastyle means that it has seven columns across the entrance front.

==== Proportion and optical illusion ====
The ideal of proportion that was used by ancient Greek architects in designing temples was not a simple mathematical progression using a square module. The math involved a more complex geometrical progression, the so-called golden mean. The ratio is similar to that of the growth patterns of many spiral forms that occur in nature such as rams' horns, nautilus shells, fern fronds, and vine tendrils and which were a source of decorative motifs employed by ancient Greek architects as particularly in evidence in the volutes of capitals of the Ionic and Corinthian Orders.

$$\frac 1 \varphi = \varphi - 1;\; \varphi = \frac{1 + \sqrt{5}}{2} \approx 1.618$$

The ancient Greek architects took a philosophic approach to the rules and proportions. The determining factor in the mathematics of any notable work of architecture was its ultimate appearance. The architects calculated for perspective, for the optical illusions that make edges of objects appear concave and for the fact that columns that are viewed against the sky look different from those adjacent that are viewed against a shadowed wall. Because of these factors, the architects adjusted the plans so that the major lines of any significant building are rarely straight. The most obvious adjustment is to the profile of columns, which narrow from base to top. However, the narrowing is not regular, but gently curved so that each column appears to have a slight swelling, called entasis below the middle. The entasis is never sufficiently pronounced as to make the swelling wider than the base; it is controlled by a slight reduction in the rate of decrease of diameter.

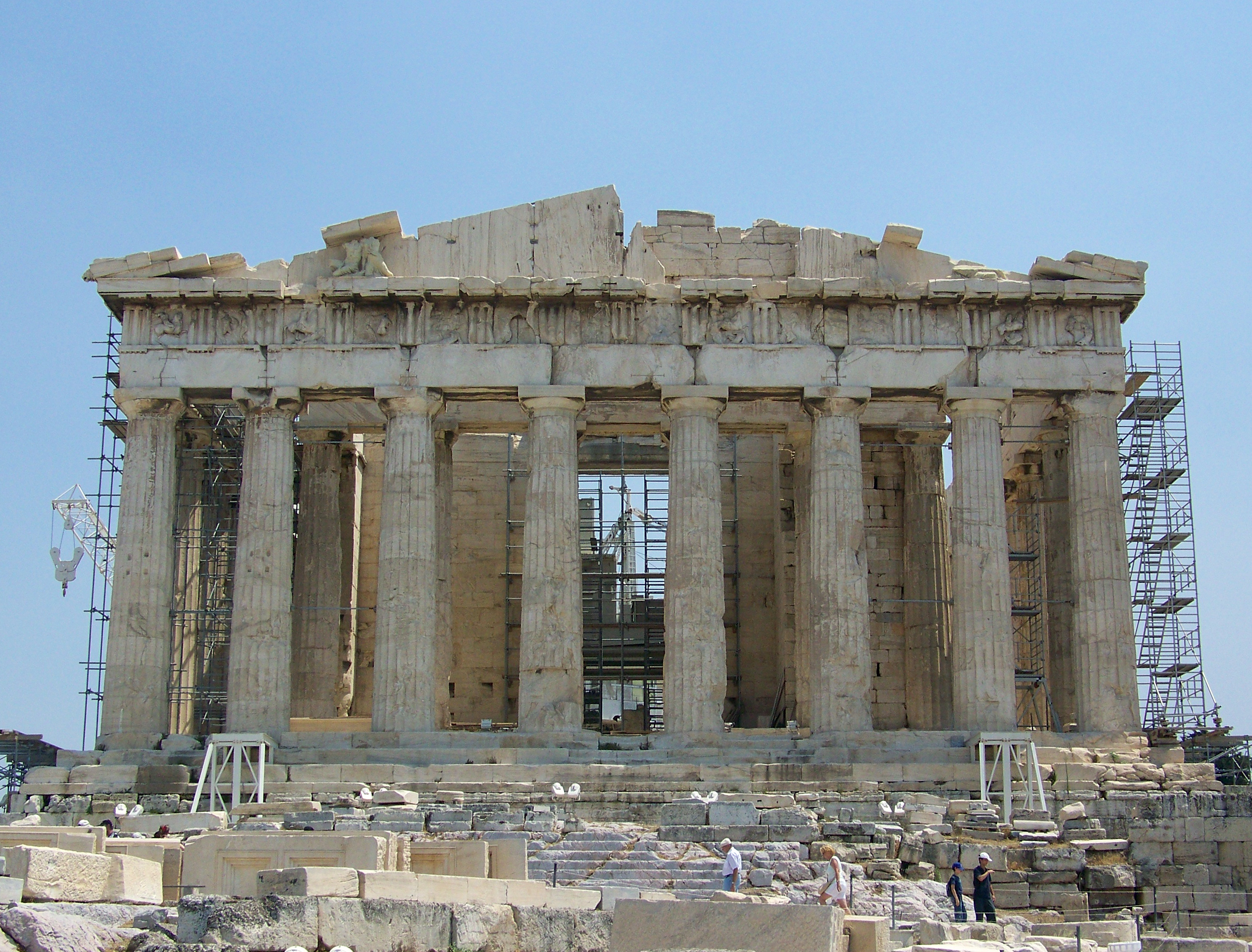
The main lines of the Parthenon are all curved.

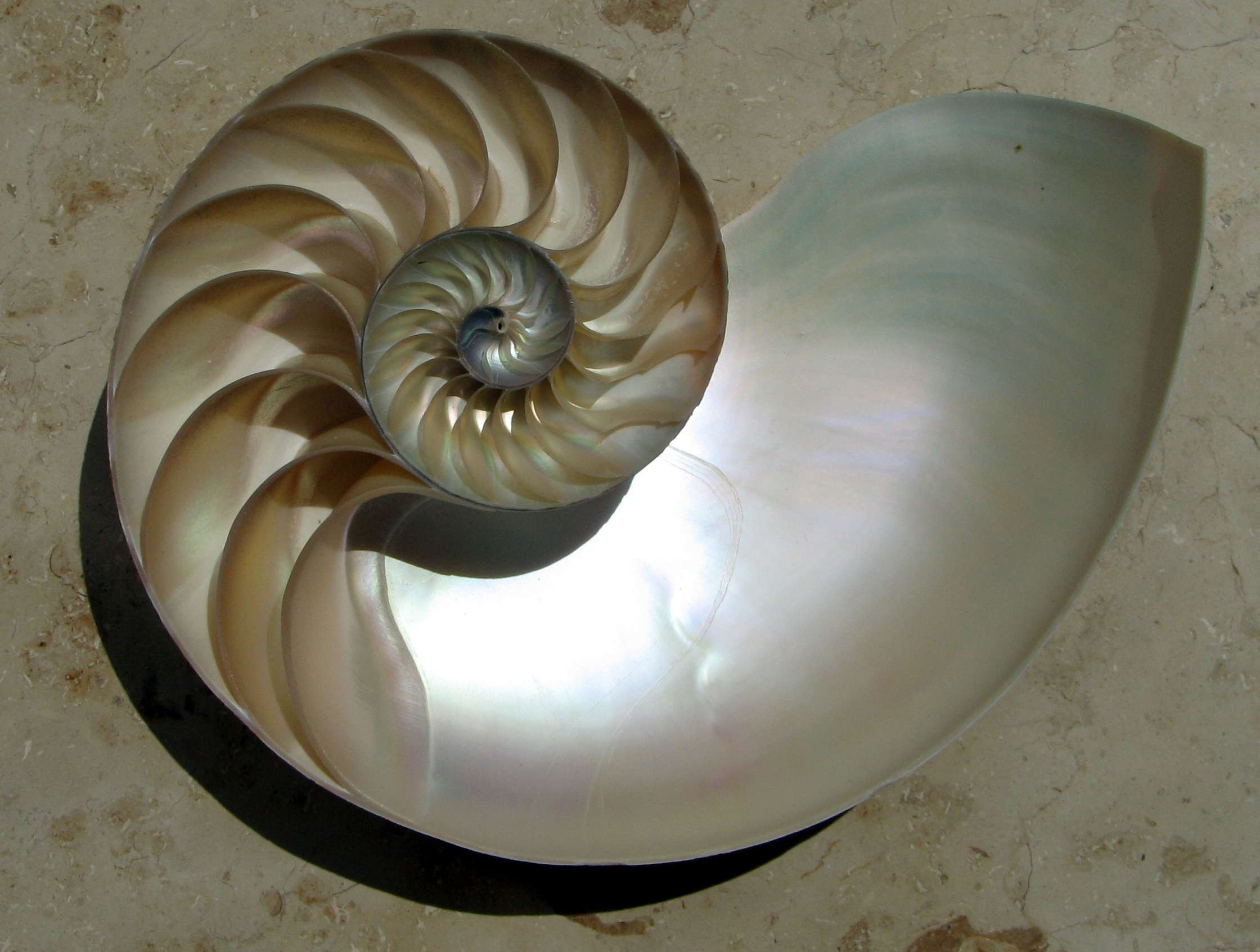
A sectioned nautilus shell. These shells may have provided inspiration for voluted Ionic capitals.

The growth of the nautilus corresponds to the Golden Mean

The Parthenon, the Temple to the Goddess Athena on the Acropolis in Athens, is referred to by many as the pinnacle of ancient Greek architecture. Helen Gardner refers to its "unsurpassable excellence", to be surveyed, studied and emulated by architects of later ages. Yet, as Gardner points out, there is hardly a straight line in the building. Banister Fletcher calculated that the stylobate curves upward so that its centres at either end rise about 65 millimetres (2.6 inches) above the outer corners, and 110 mm (4.3 in) on the longer sides. A slightly greater adjustment has been made to the entablature. The columns at the ends of the building are not vertical but are inclined towards the centre, with those at the corners being out of plumb by about 65 mm (2.6 in). These outer columns are both slightly wider than their neighbours and are slightly closer than any of the others.

== Style ==
Orders of ancient Greek architecture
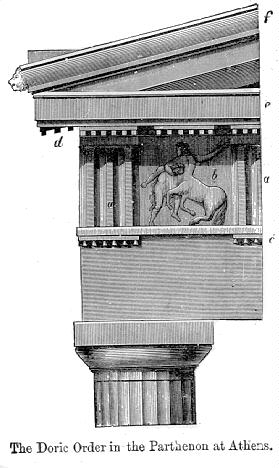

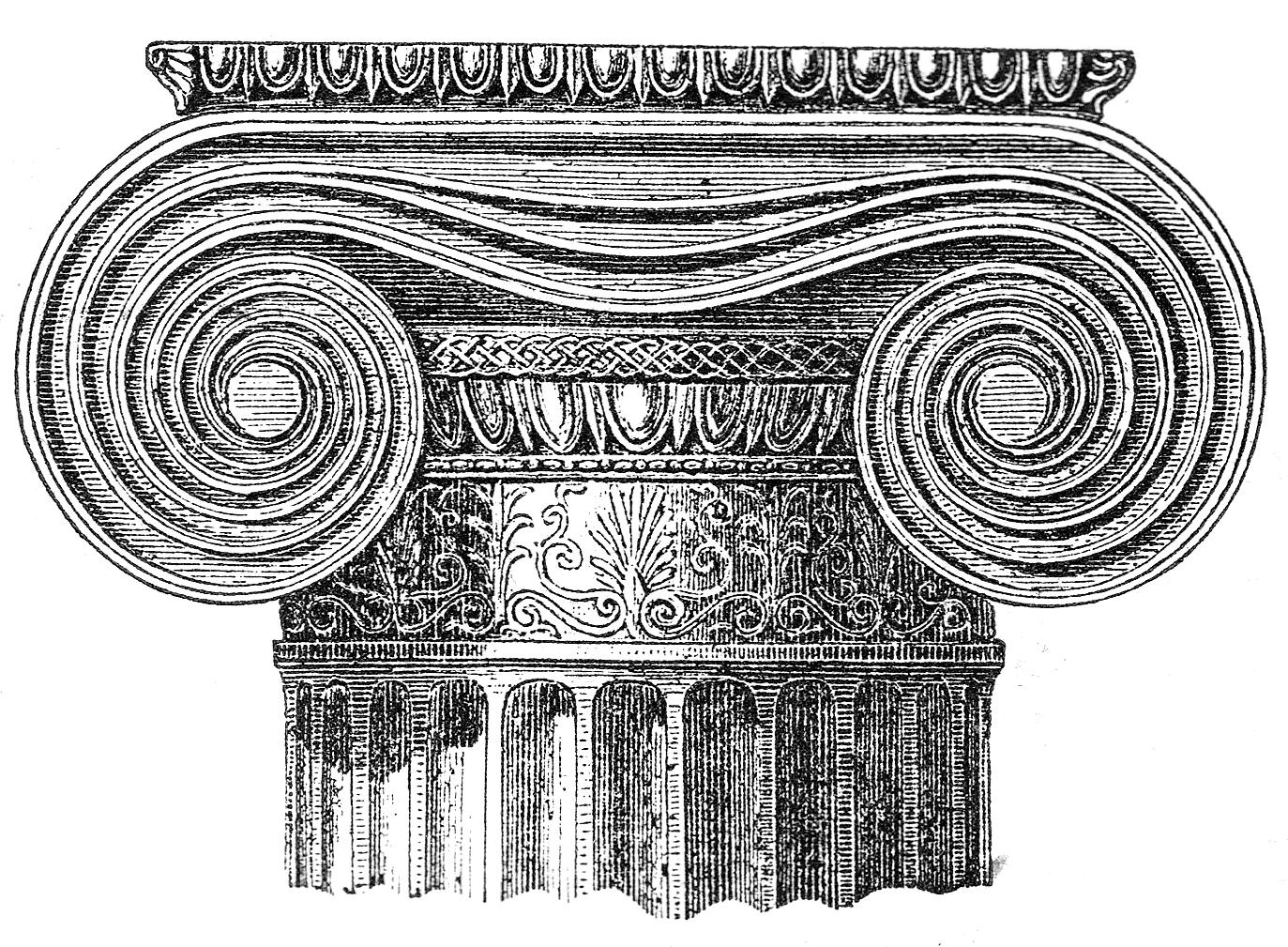
above: Capital of the Ionic order showing volutes and ornamented echinus

left: Architectural elements of the Doric order showing simple curved echinus of capital

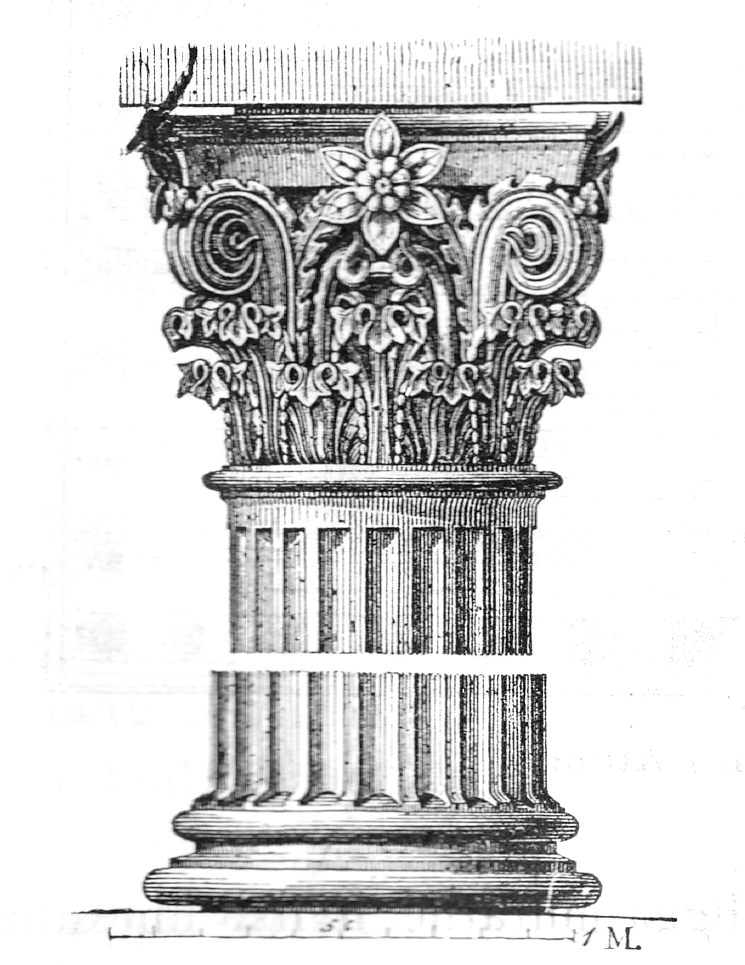
above: Capital of the Corinthian Order showing foliate decoration and vertical volutes.

=== Orders ===
Ancient Greek architecture of the most formal type, for temples and other public buildings, is divided stylistically into three Classical orders, first described by the Roman architectural writer Vitruvius. These are: the Doric order, the Ionic order, and the Corinthian order, the names reflecting their regional origins within the Greek world. While the three orders are most easily recognizable by their capitals, they also governed the form, proportions, details and relationships of the columns, entablature, pediment, and the stylobate. The different orders were applied to the whole range of buildings and monuments.

The Doric order developed on mainland Greece and spread to Magna Graecia (Italy). It was firmly established and well-defined in its characteristics by the time of the building of the Temple of Hera at Olympia, c. 600 BC. The Ionic order co-existed with the Doric, being favoured by the Greek cities of Ionia, in Asia Minor and the Aegean Islands. It did not reach a clearly defined form until the mid 5th century BC. The early Ionic temples of Asia Minor were particularly ambitious in scale, such as the Temple of Artemis at Ephesus. The Corinthian order was a highly decorative variant not developed until the Hellenistic period and retaining many characteristics of the Ionic. It was popularised by the Romans.

==== Doric order ====
The Doric order is recognised by its capital, of which the echinus is like a circular cushion rising from the top of the column to the square abacus on which rest the lintels. The echinus appears flat and splayed in early examples, deeper and with greater curve in later, more refined examples, and smaller and straight-sided in Hellenistic examples. A refinement of the Doric column is the entasis, a gentle convex swelling to the profile of the column, which prevents an optical illusion of concavity. This is more pronounced in earlier examples.

Doric columns are almost always cut with grooves, known as "fluting", which run the length of the column and are usually 20 in number, although sometimes fewer. The flutes meet at sharp edges called arrises. At the top of the columns, slightly below the narrowest point, and crossing the terminating arrises, are three horizontal grooves known as the hypotrachelion. Doric columns have no bases, until a few examples in the Hellenistic period.

The columns of an early Doric temple such as the Temple of Apollo at Syracuse, Sicily, may have a height to base diameter ratio of only 4:1 and a column height to entablature ratio of 2:1, with relatively crude details. A column height to diameter of 6:1 became more usual, while the column height to entablature ratio at the Parthenon is about 3:1. During the Hellenistic period, Doric conventions of solidity and masculinity dropped away, with the slender and unfluted columns reaching a height to diameter ratio of 7.5:1.

The Doric Order
The Temple of Hephaestos, Athens, is a well-preserved temple of peripteral hexastyle plan.
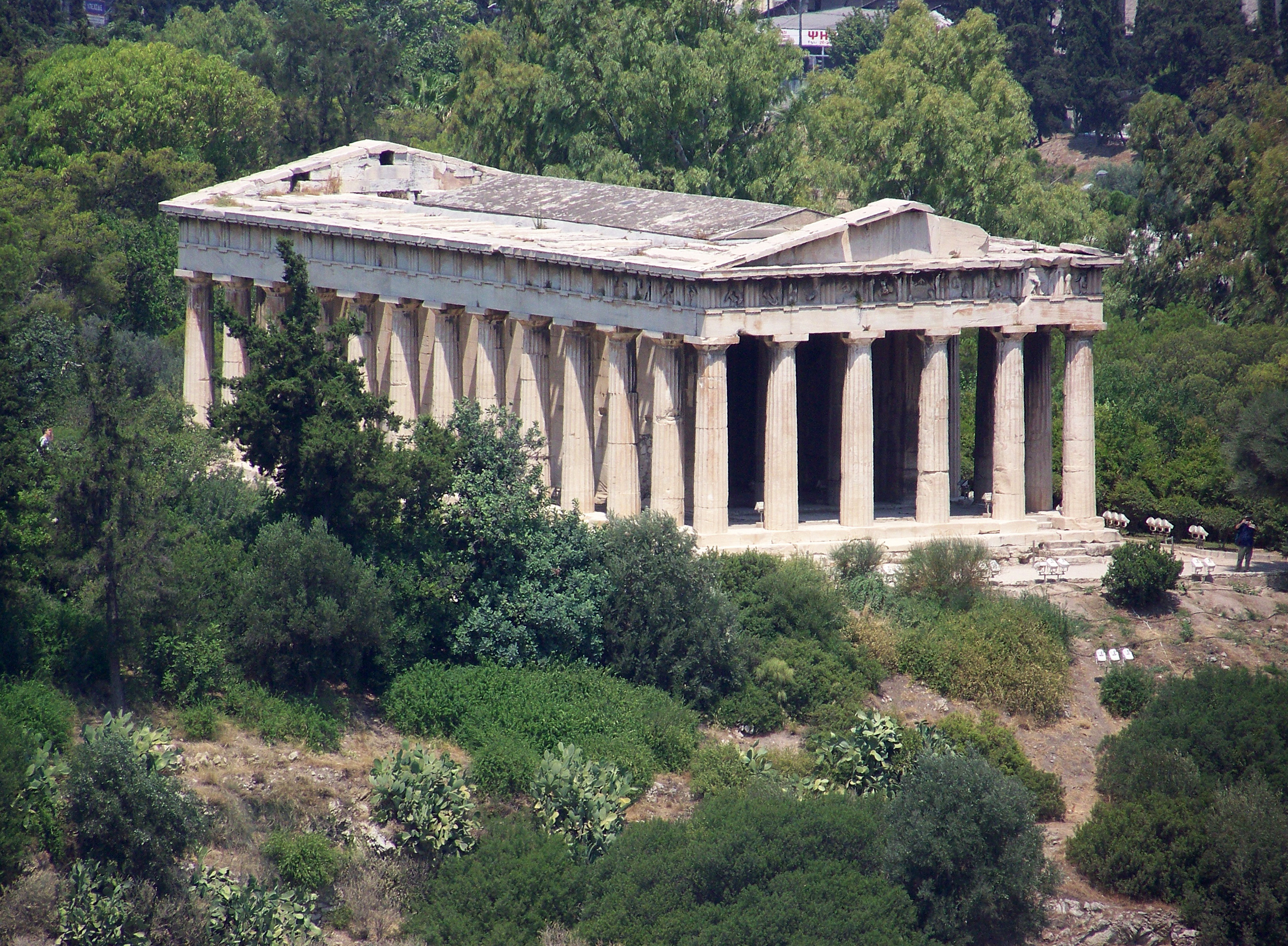

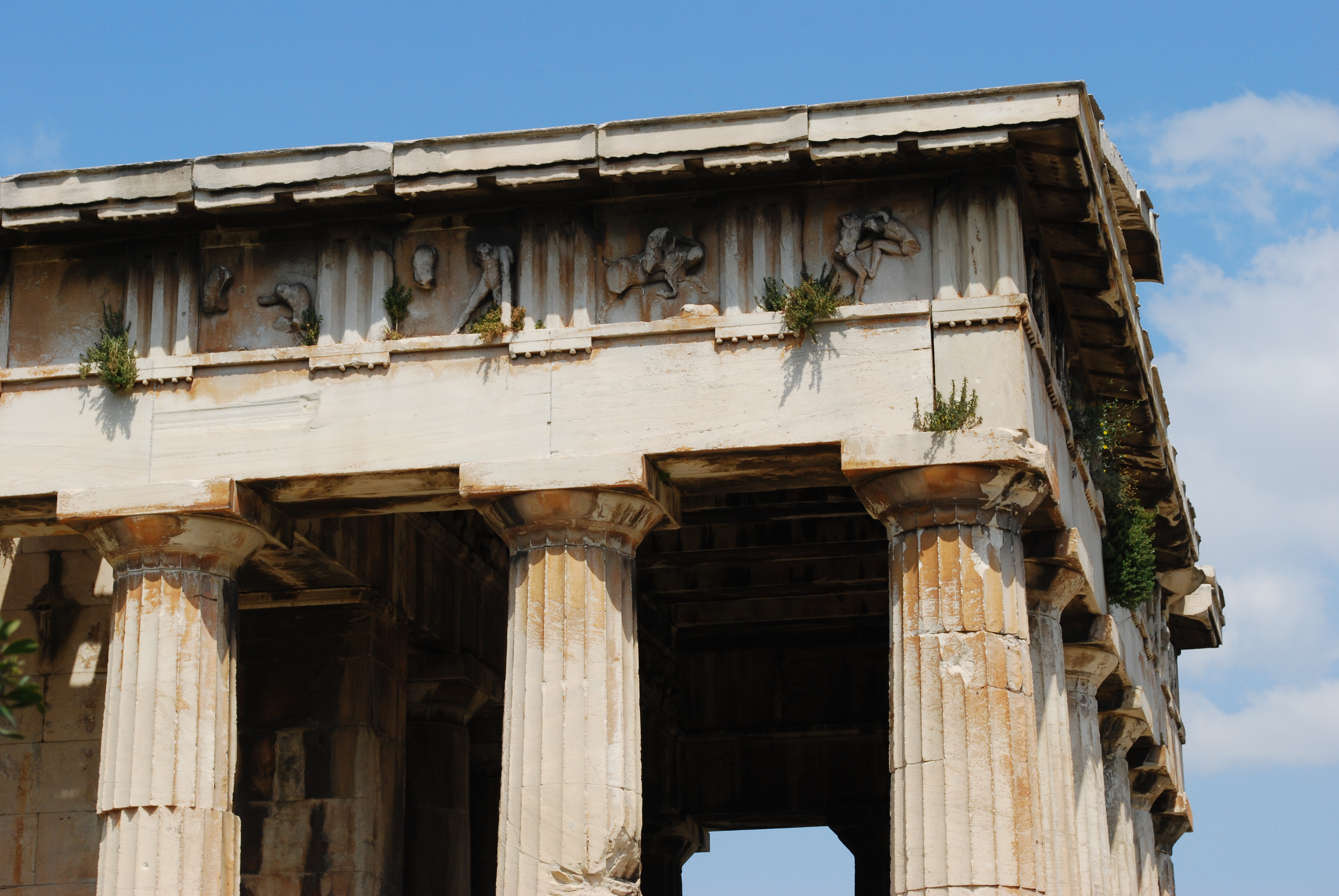
The entablature showing the architrave, frieze with triglyphs and metopes and the overhanging cornice

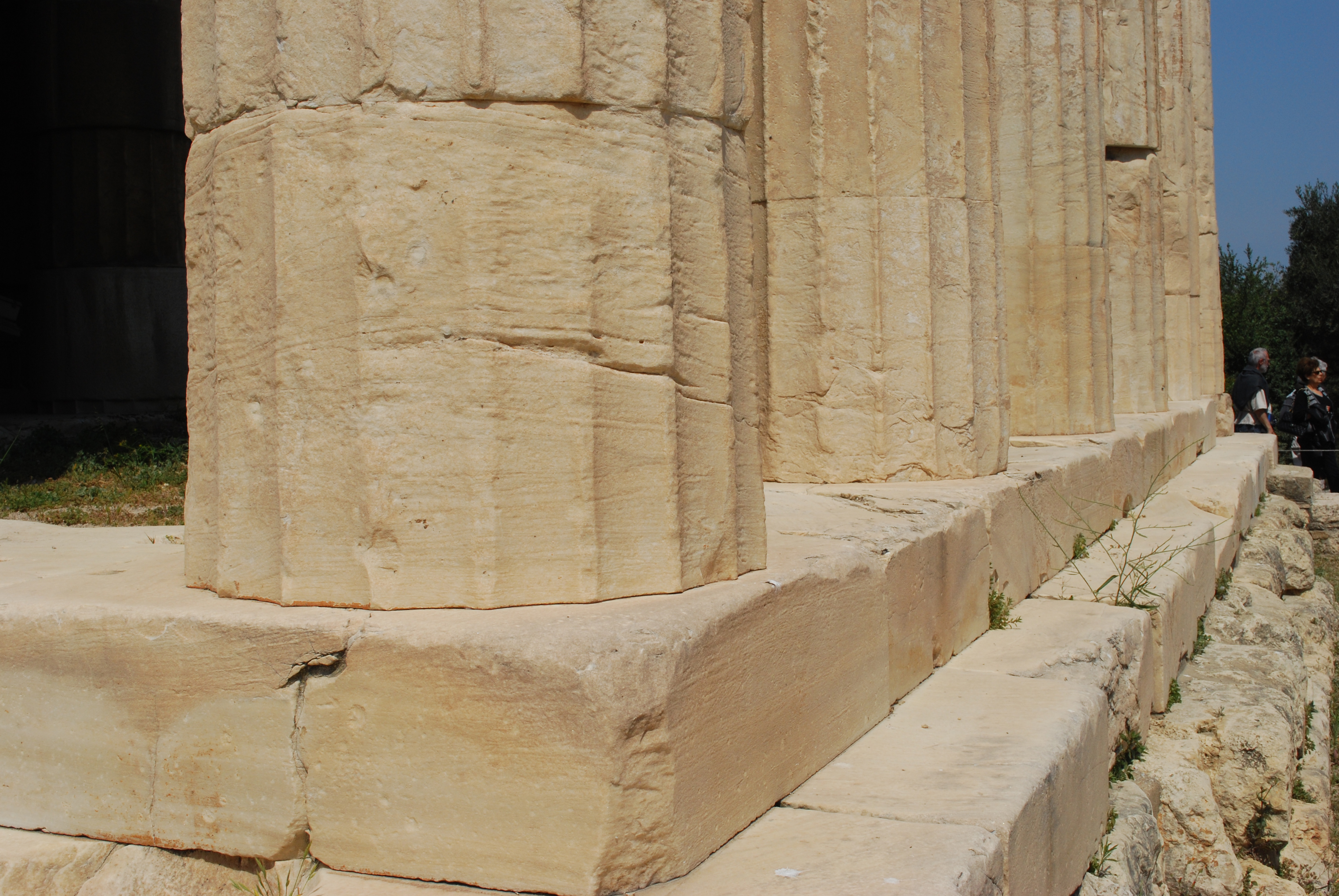
The tapered fluted columns, constructed in drums, rest directly on the stylobate.

The Doric entablature is in three parts, the architrave, the frieze and the cornice. The architrave is composed of the stone lintels which span the space between the columns, with a joint occurring above the centre of each abacus. On this rests the frieze, one of the major areas of sculptural decoration. The frieze is divided into triglyphs and metopes, the triglyphs, as stated elsewhere in this article, are a reminder of the timber history of the architectural style. Each triglyph has three vertical grooves, similar to the columnar fluting, and below them, seemingly connected, are guttae, small strips that appear to connect the triglyphs to the architrave below. A triglyph is located above the centre of each capital, and above the centre of each lintel. However, at the corners of the building, the triglyphs do not fall over the centre the column. The ancient architects took a pragmatic approach to the apparent "rules", simply extending the width of the last two metopes at each end of the building.

The cornice is a narrow jutting band of complex molding, which overhangs and protects the ornamented frieze, like the edge of an overhanging wooden-framed roof. It is decorated on the underside with projecting blocks, mutules, further suggesting the wooden nature of the prototype. At either end of the building the pediment rises from the cornice, framed by moulding of similar form.

The pediment is decorated with figures that are in relief in the earlier examples, though almost free-standing by the time of the sculpture on the Parthenon. Early architectural sculptors found difficulty in creating satisfactory sculptural compositions in the tapering triangular space. By the Early Classical period, with the decoration of the Temple of Zeus at Olympia (486–460 BC), the sculptors had solved the problem by having a standing central figure framed by rearing centaurs and fighting men who are falling, kneeling and lying in attitudes that fit the size and angle of each part of the space. The famous sculptor Phidias fills the space at the Parthenon (448–432 BC) with a complex array of draped and undraped figures of deities, who appear in attitudes of sublime relaxation and elegance.

==== Ionic order ====
The Ionic order is recognized by its voluted capital, in which a curved echinus of similar shape to that of the Doric order, but decorated with stylised ornament, is surmounted by a horizontal band that scrolls under to either side, forming spirals or volutes similar to those of the nautilus shell or ram's horn. In plan, the capital is rectangular. It is designed to be viewed frontally but the capitals at the corners of buildings are modified with an additional scroll so as to appear regular on two adjoining faces. In the Hellenistic period, four-fronted Ionic capitals became common.

The Ionic Order
The Erechtheion, Acropolis, Athens: a building of asymmetrical plan, for the display of offerings to Athena
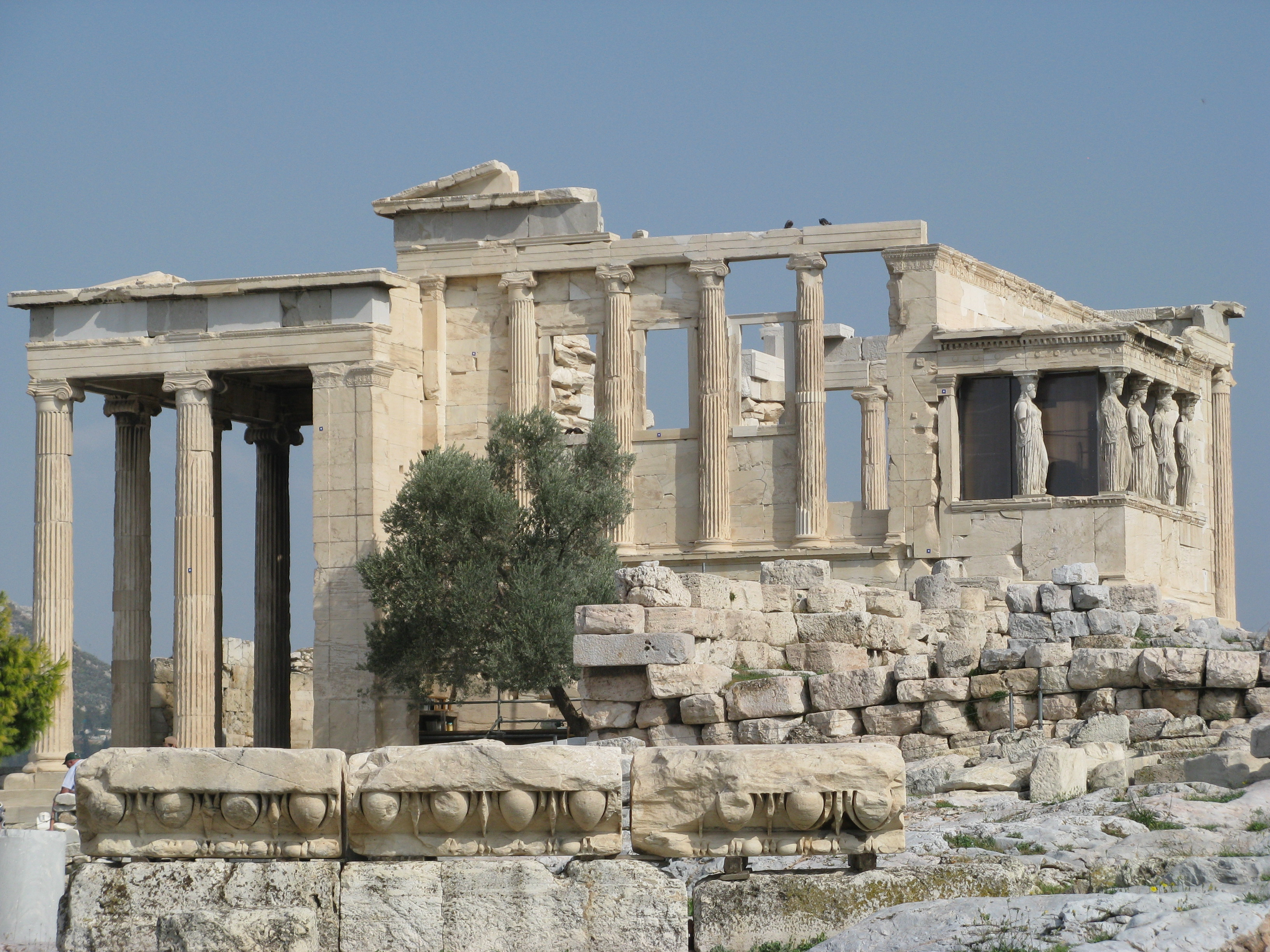

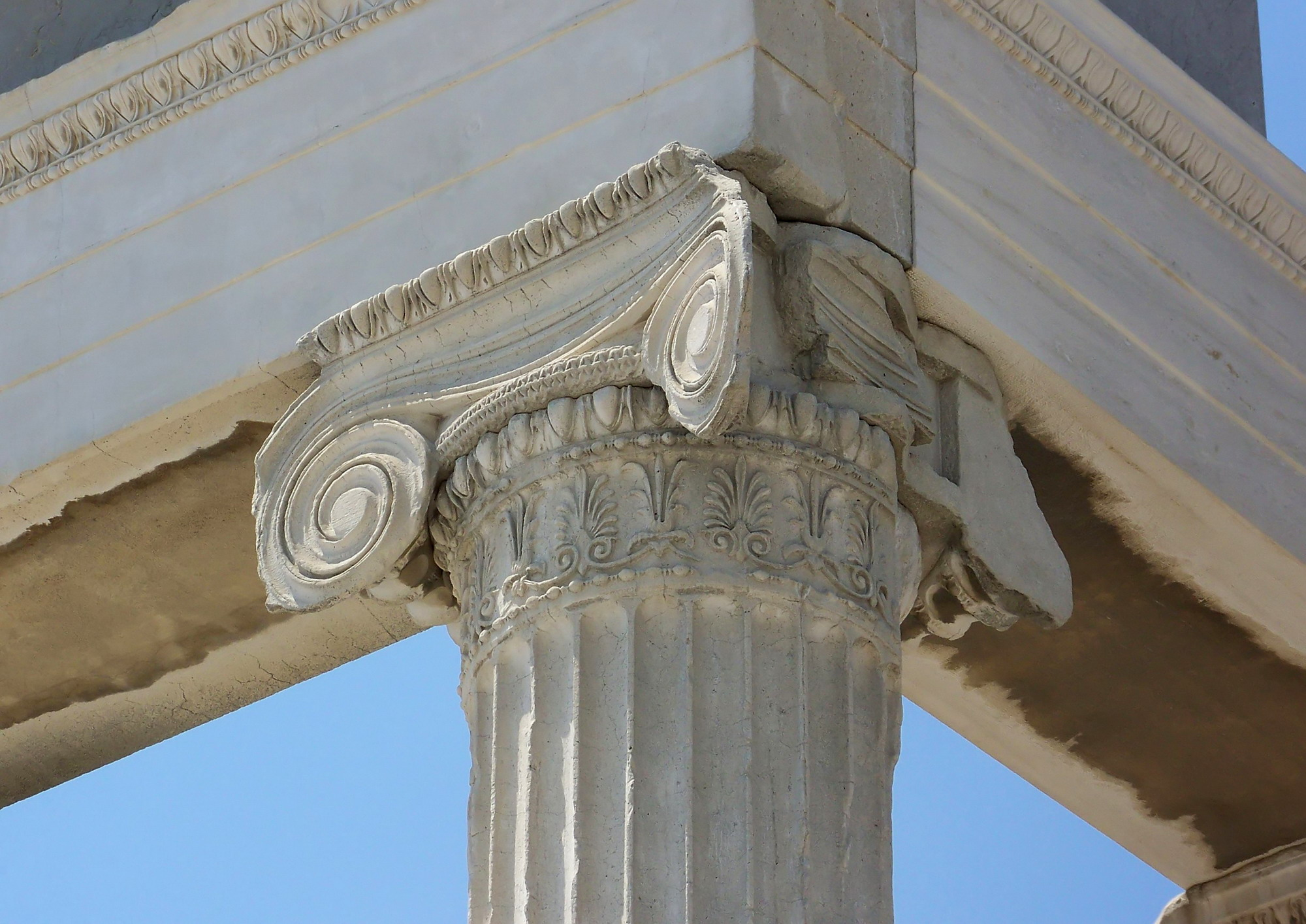
Corner capital with a diagonal volute, showing also details of the fluting separated by fillets.

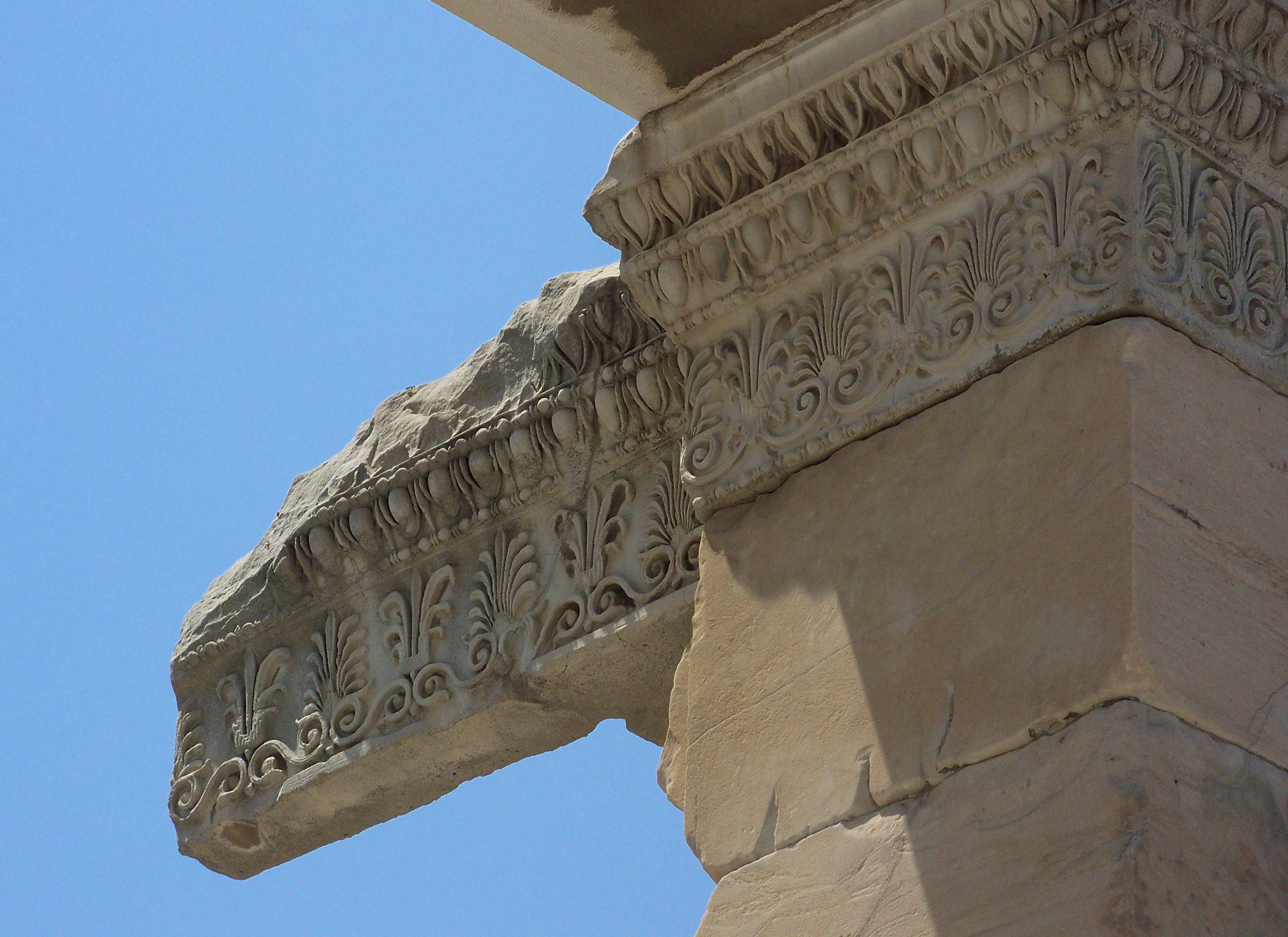
Frieze of stylised alternating palms and reeds, and a cornice decorated with "egg and dart" moulding.

Like the Doric order, the Ionic order retains signs of having its origins in wooden architecture. The horizontal spread of a flat timber plate across the top of a column is a common device in wooden construction, giving a thin upright a wider area on which to bear the lintel, while at the same time reinforcing the load-bearing strength of the lintel itself. Likewise, the columns always have bases, a necessity in wooden architecture to spread the load and protect the base of a comparatively thin upright. The columns are fluted with narrow, shallow flutes that do not meet at a sharp edge but have a flat band or fillet between them. The usual number of flutes is twenty-four but there may be as many as forty-four. The base has two convex mouldings called torus, and from the late Hellenic period stood on a square plinth similar to the abacus.

The architrave of the Ionic order is sometimes undecorated, but more often rises in three outwardly-stepped bands like overlapping timber planks. The frieze, which runs in a continuous band, is separated from the other members by rows of small projecting blocks. They are referred to as dentils, meaning "teeth", but their origin is clearly in narrow wooden slats which supported the roof of a timber structure. The Ionic order is altogether lighter in appearance than the Doric, with the columns, including base and capital, having a 9:1 ratio with the diameter, while the whole entablature was also much narrower and less heavy than the Doric entablature. There was some variation in the distribution of decoration. Formalised bands of motifs such as alternating forms known as egg-and-dart were a feature of the Ionic entablatures, along with the bands of dentils. The external frieze often contained a continuous band of figurative sculpture or ornament, but this was not always the case. Sometimes a decorative frieze occurred around the upper part of the naos rather than on the exterior of the building. These Ionic-style friezes around the naos are sometimes found on Doric buildings, notably the Parthenon. Some temples, like the Temple of Artemis at Ephesus, had friezes of figures around the lower drum of each column, separated from the fluted section by a bold moulding.

Caryatids, draped female figures used as supporting members to carry the entablature, were a feature of the Ionic order, occurring at several buildings including the Siphnian Treasury at Delphi in 525 BC and at the Erechtheion, about 410 BC.

==== Corinthian order ====
The Corinthian order does not have its origin in wooden architecture. It grew directly out of the Ionic in the mid 5th century BC, and was initially of much the same style and proportion, but distinguished by its more ornate capitals. The capital was very much deeper than either the Doric or the Ionic capital, being shaped like a large krater, a bell-shaped mixing bowl, and being ornamented with a double row of acanthus leaves above which rose voluted tendrils, supporting the corners of the abacus, which, no longer perfectly square, splayed above them. According to Vitruvius, the capital was invented by a bronze founder, Callimachus of Corinth, who took his inspiration from a basket of offerings that had been placed on a grave, with a flat tile on top to protect the goods. The basket had been placed on the root of an acanthus plant which had grown up around it. The ratio of the column height to diameter is generally 10:1, with the capital taking up more than 1/10 of the height. The ratio of capital height to diameter is generally about 1.16:1.

The Corinthian Order
The Temple of Zeus Olympia, Athens, ("the Olympieion")
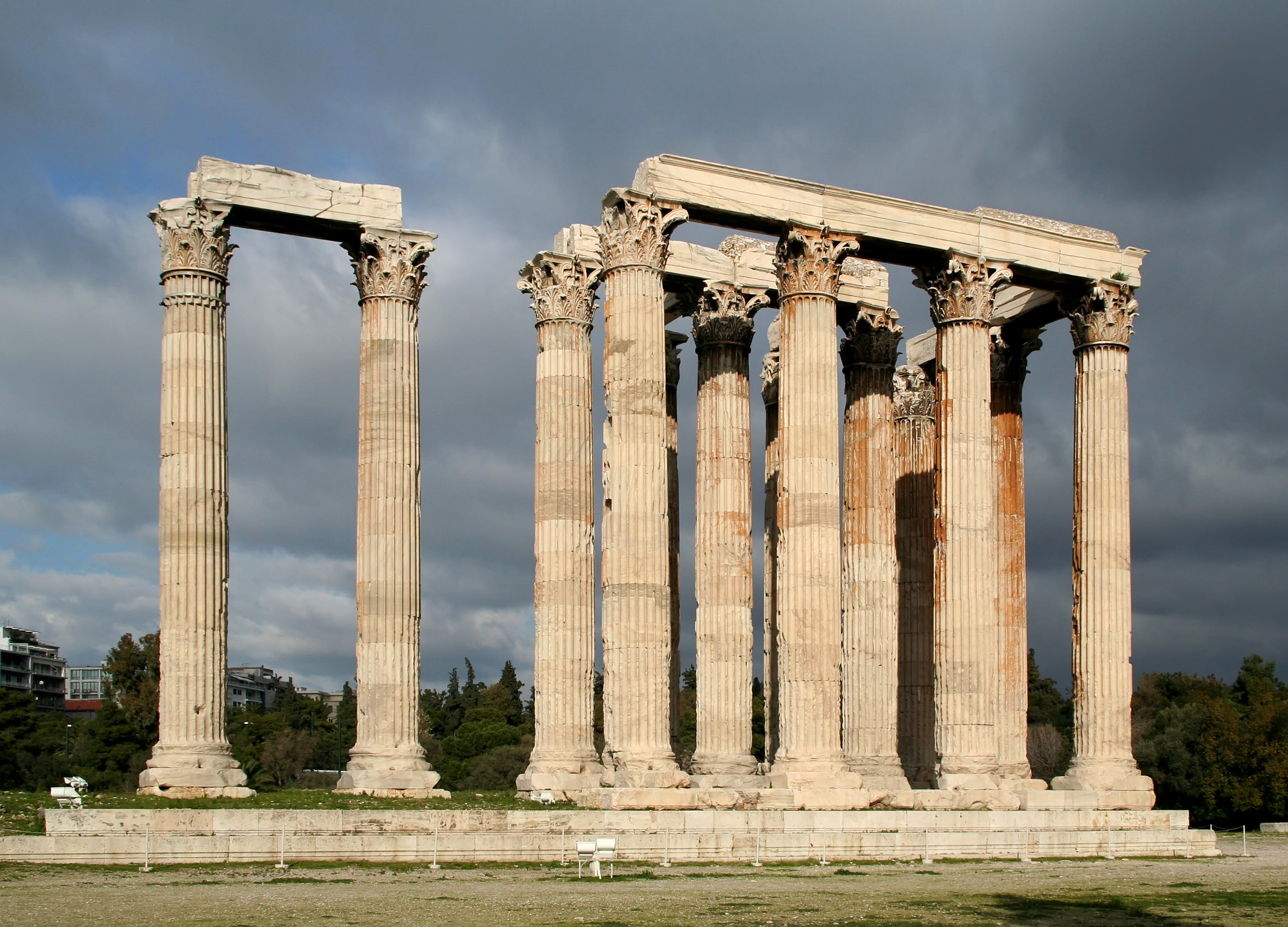

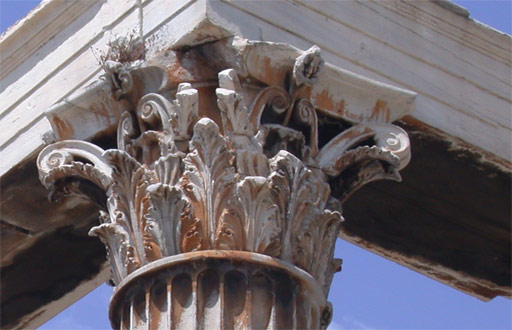
The tall capital combines both semi-naturalistic leaves and highly stylised tendrils forming volutes.

The Corinthian order was initially used internally, as at the Temple of Apollo Epicurius at Bassae (c. 450–425 BC). In 334 BC, it appeared as an external feature on the Choragic Monument of Lysicrates in Athens, and then on a huge scale at the Temple of Zeus Olympia in Athens (174 BC–132 AD). It was popularised by the Romans, who added a number of refinements and decorative details. During the Hellenistic period, Corinthian columns were sometimes built without fluting.

=== Decoration ===
==== Architectural ornament ====
Architectural ornament of fired and painted clay

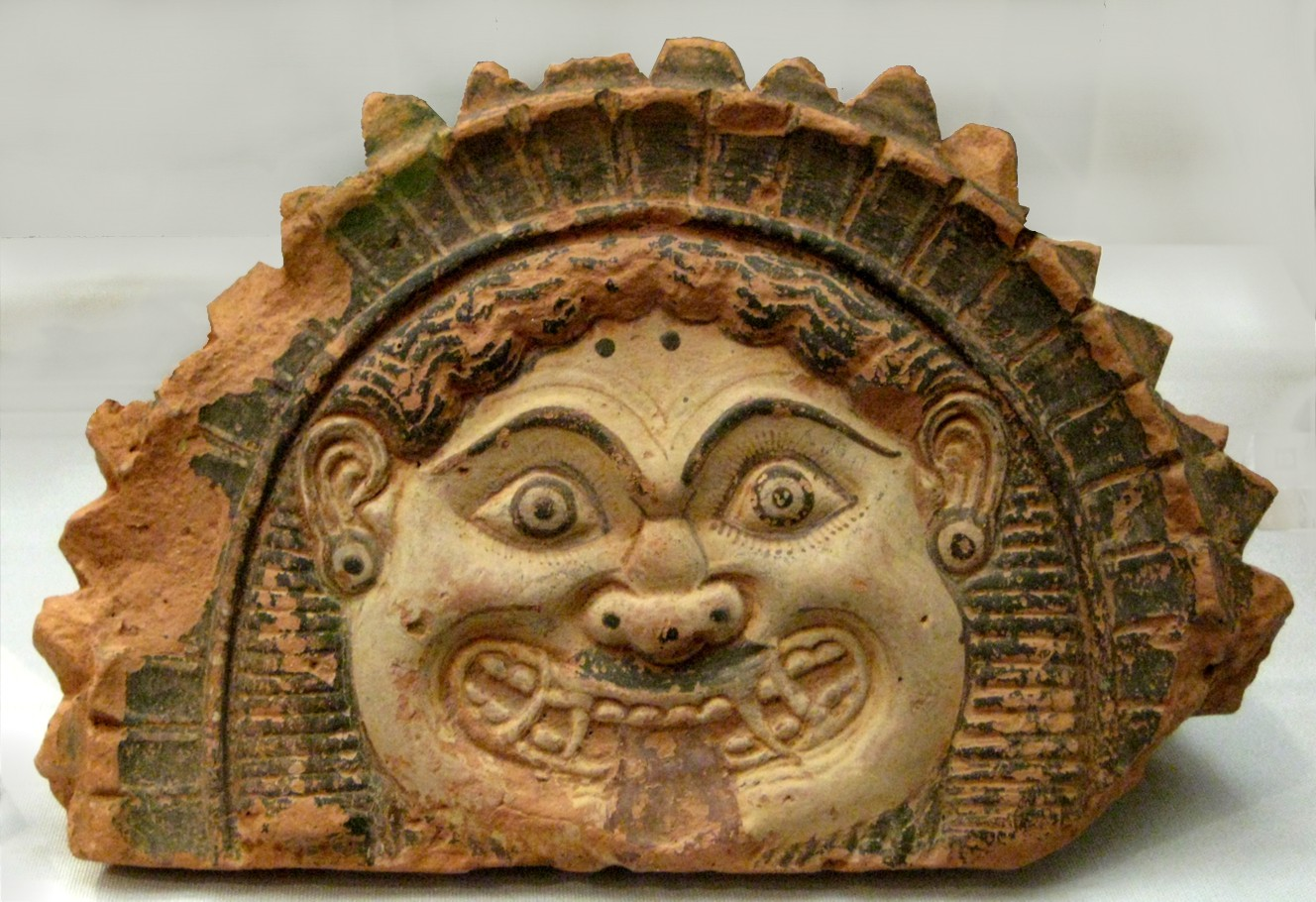
This Archaic gorgon's head antefix has been cast in a mould, fired and painted.

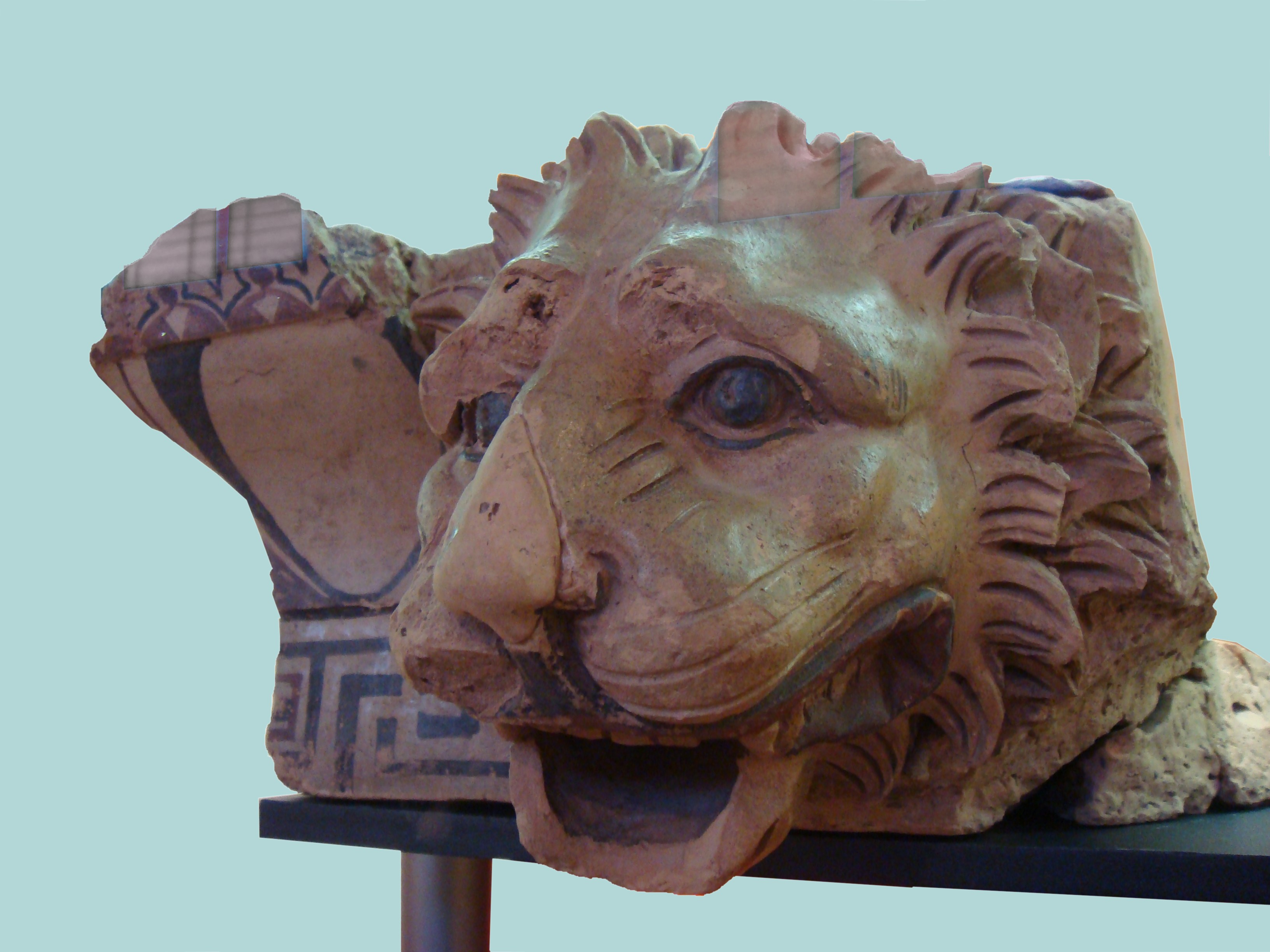
The lion's head gargoyle is fixed to a revetment on which elements of a formal frieze have been painted.

Early wooden structures, particularly temples, were ornamented and in part protected by fired and painted terracotta revetments in the form of rectangular panels, and ornamental discs. Many fragments of these have outlived the buildings that they decorated and demonstrate a wealth of formal border designs of geometric scrolls, overlapping patterns and foliate motifs. With the introduction of stone-built temples, the revetments no longer served a protective purpose and sculptured decoration became more common.

The clay ornaments were limited to the roof of buildings, decorating the cornice, the corners and surmounting the pediment. At the corners of pediments they were called acroteria and along the sides of the building, antefixes. Early decorative elements were generally semi-circular, but later of roughly triangular shape with moulded ornament, often palmate. Ionic cornices were often set with a row of lion's masks, with open mouths that ejected rainwater. From the Late Classical period, acroteria were sometimes sculptured figures (see Architectural sculpture).

In the three orders of ancient Greek architecture, the sculptural decoration, be it a simple half round astragal, a frieze of stylised foliage or the ornate sculpture of the pediment, is all essential to the architecture of which it is a part. In the Doric order, there is no variation in its placement. Reliefs never decorate walls in an arbitrary way. The sculpture is always located in several predetermined areas, the metopes and the pediment. In later Ionic architecture, there is greater diversity in the types and numbers of mouldings and decorations, particularly around doorways, where voluted brackets sometimes occur supporting an ornamental cornice over a door, such as that at the Erechtheion. A much applied narrow moulding is called "bead and reel" and is symmetrical, stemming from turned wooden prototypes. Wider mouldings include one with tongue-like or pointed leaf shapes, which are grooved and sometimes turned upward at the tip, and "egg and dart" moulding which alternates ovoid shapes with narrow pointed ones.

==== Architectural sculpture ====
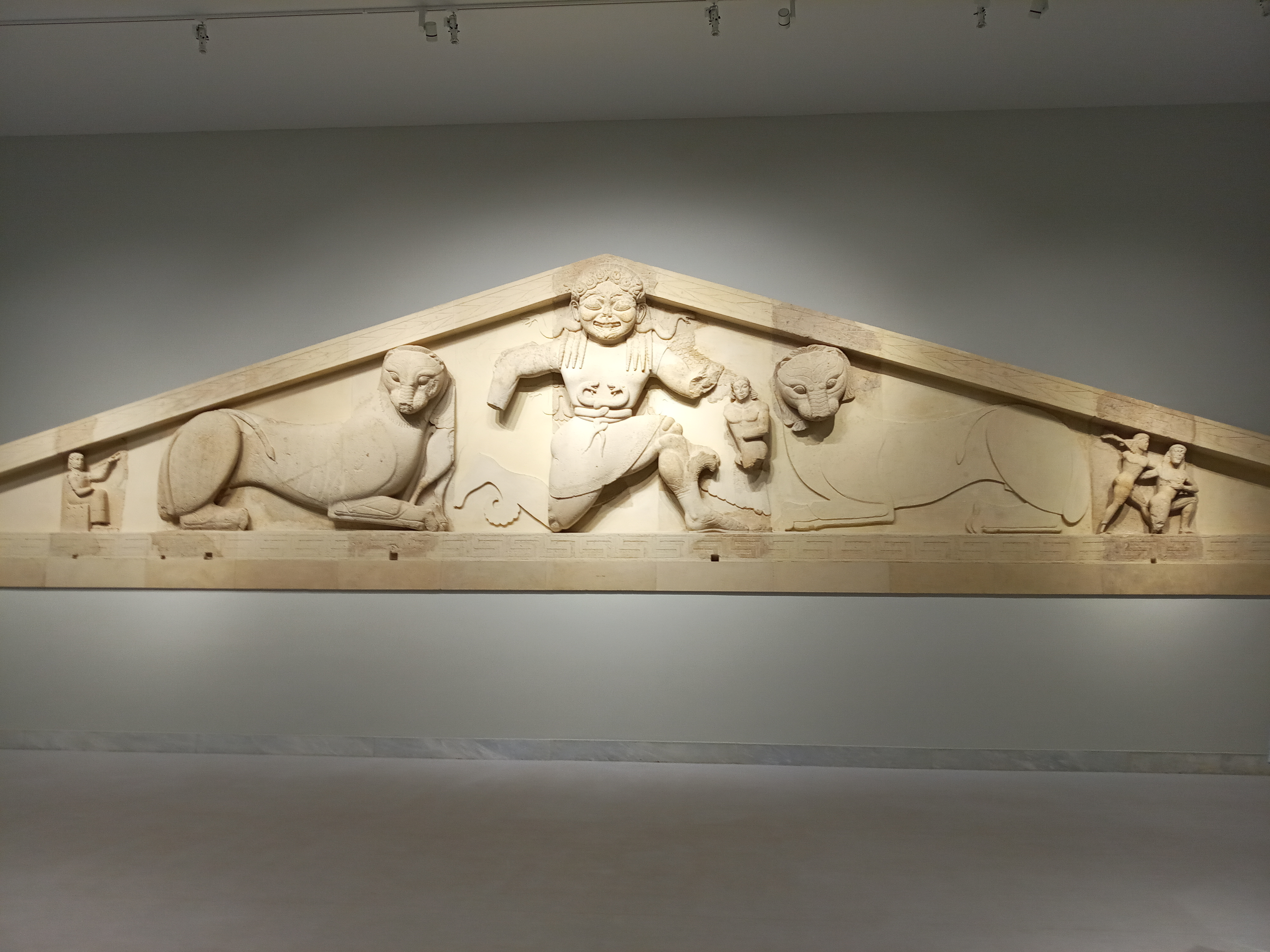
The Archaic Gorgon of the western pediment from the Artemis Temple of Corfu, Archaeological Museum of Corfu.

Architectural sculpture showed a development from early Archaic examples through Severe Classical, High Classical, Late Classical and Hellenistic. Remnants of Archaic architectural sculpture (700–500 BC) exist from the early 6th century BC with the earliest surviving pedimental sculptures being fragments of a Gorgon flanked by heraldic panthers from the centre of the pediment of the Artemis Temple of Corfu. A metope from a temple known as "Temple C" at Selinus, Sicily, shows, in a better preserved state, Perseus slaying the Gorgon Medusa. Both images parallel the stylised depiction of the Gorgons on the black figure name vase decorated by the Nessos painter (c. 600 BC), with the face and shoulders turned frontally, and the legs in a running or kneeling position. At this date, images of terrifying monsters have predominance over the emphasis on the human figure that developed with Humanist philosophy.

Early pedimental sculptures, and those on smaller temples, were usually in relief, and the late free-standing ones were often in terracotta, which has survived only in fragments. The sculptures were covered with a layer of stucco and painted or, if terracotta, painted with the more restrained fired colours of Greek pottery.

The Severe Classical Style (500–450 BC) is represented by the pedimental sculptures of the Temple of Zeus at Olympia (470–456 BC). The eastern pediment shows a moment of stillness and "impending drama" before the beginning of a chariot race, the figures of Zeus and the competitors being severe and idealised representations of the human form. The western pediment has Apollo as the central figure, "majestic" and "remote", presiding over a battle of Lapiths and Centaurs, in strong contrast to that of the eastern pediment for its depiction of violent action, and described by Donald E. Strong as the "most powerful piece of illustration" for a hundred years.

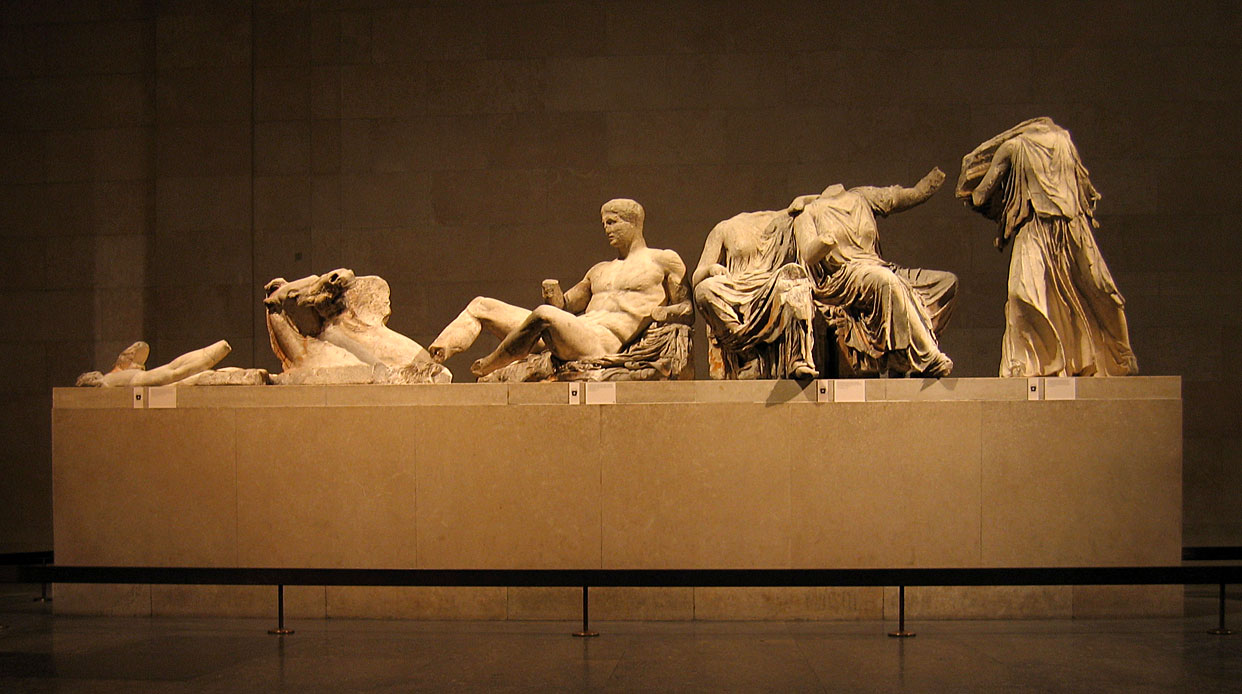
Classical figurative sculpture from the eastern pediment of the Parthenon, British Museum.

The reliefs and three-dimensional sculpture which adorned the frieze and pediments, respectively, of the Parthenon, are the lifelike products of the High Classical style (450–400 BC) and were created under the direction of the sculptor Phidias. The pedimental sculpture represents the Gods of Olympus, while the frieze shows the Panathenaic procession and ceremonial events that took place every four years to honour the titular Goddess of Athens. The frieze and remaining figures of the eastern pediment show a profound understanding of the human body, and how it varies depending upon its position and the stresses that action and emotion place upon it. Benjamin Robert Haydon described the reclining figure of Dionysus as "the most heroic style of art, combined with all the essential detail of actual life".

The names of many famous sculptors are known from the Late Classical period (400–323 BC), including Timotheos, Praxiteles, Leochares and Skopas, but their works are known mainly from Roman copies. Little architectural sculpture of the period remains intact. The Temple of Asclepius at Epidauros had sculpture by Timotheos working with the architect Theodotos. Fragments of the eastern pediment survive, showing the Sack of Troy. The scene appears to have filled the space with figures carefully arranged to fit the slope and shape available, as with the earlier east pediment of the Temple of Zeus at Olympus. But the figures are more violent in action, the central space taken up, not with a commanding God, but with the dynamic figure of Neoptolemos as he seizes the aged king Priam and stabs him. The remaining fragments give the impression of a range of human emotions, fear, horror, cruelty and lust for conquest. The acroteria were sculptured by Timotheus, except for that at the centre of the east pediment which is the work of the architect. The palmate acroteria have been replaced here with small figures, the eastern pediment being surmounted by a winged Nike, poised against the wind.

Hellenistic architectural sculpture (323–31 BC) was to become more flamboyant, both in the rendering of expression and motion, which is often emphasised by flowing draperies, the Nike Samothrace which decorated a monument in the shape of a ship being a well-known example. The Pergamon Altar (c. 180–160 BC) has a frieze (120 metres long by 2.3 metres high) of figures in very high relief. The frieze represents the battle for supremacy of Gods and Titans, and employs many dramatic devices: frenzy, pathos and triumph, to convey the sense of conflict.

Metopes, friezes and caryatid

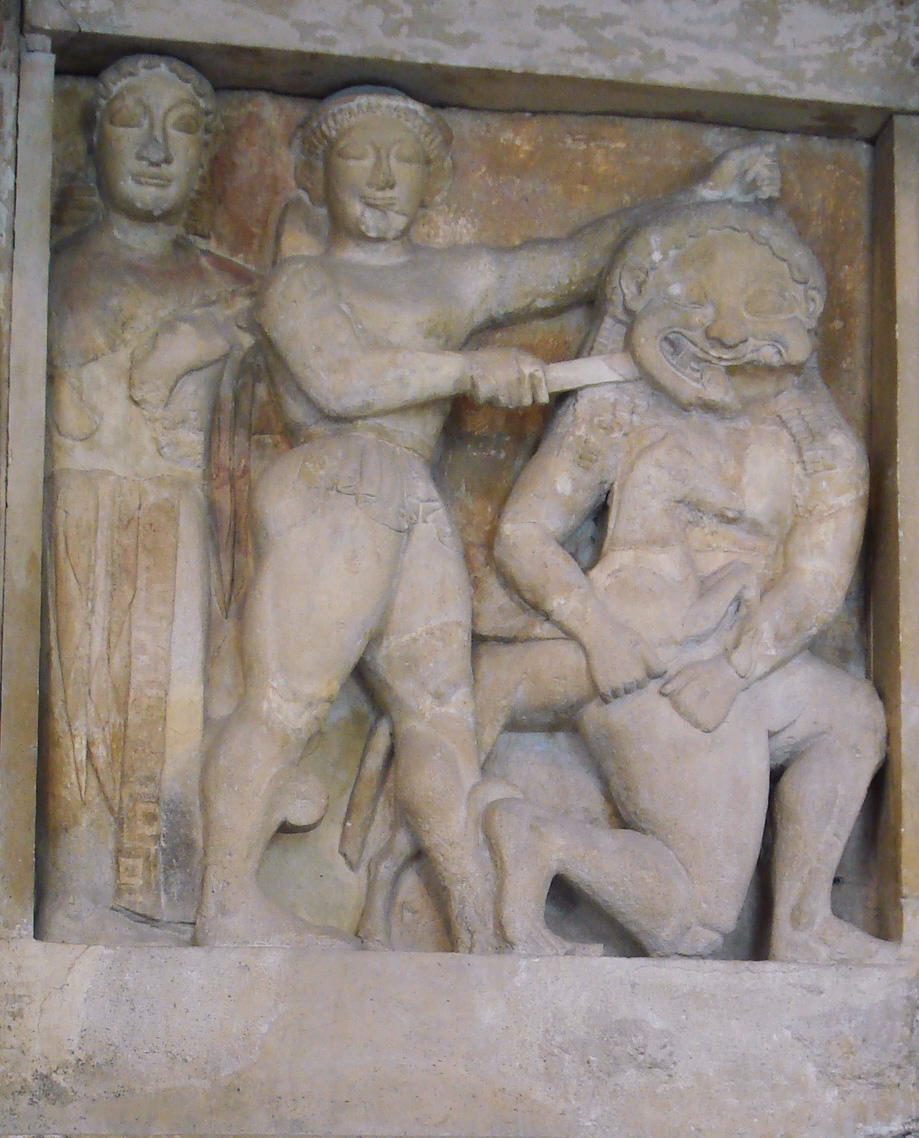
Archaic metope: Perseus and Medusa, Temple C at Selinunte.

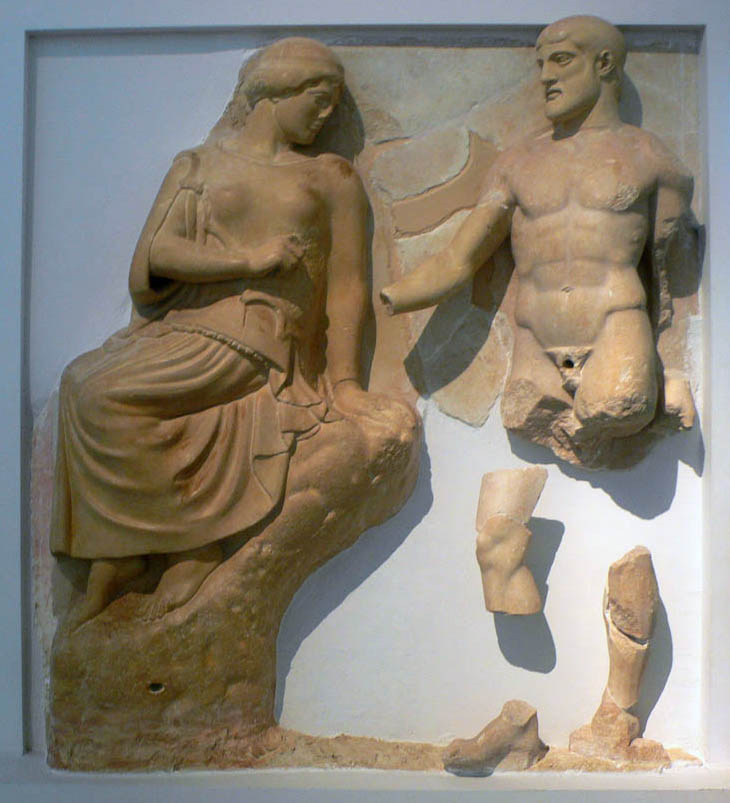
Severe Classical metope: Labours of Hercules, Temple of Zeus, Olympus

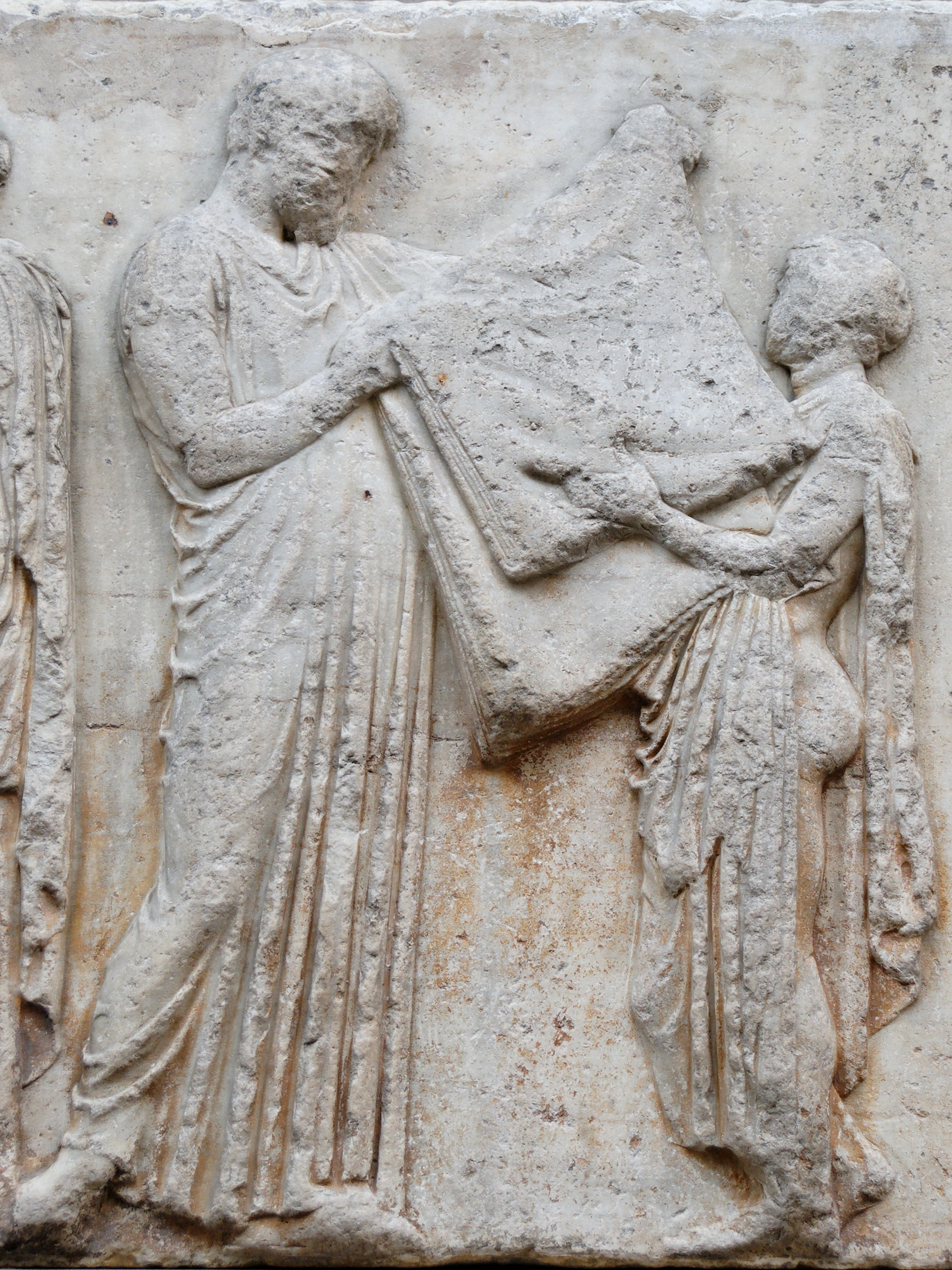
High Classical frieze: Panathenaic Ritual, Parthenon, Athens

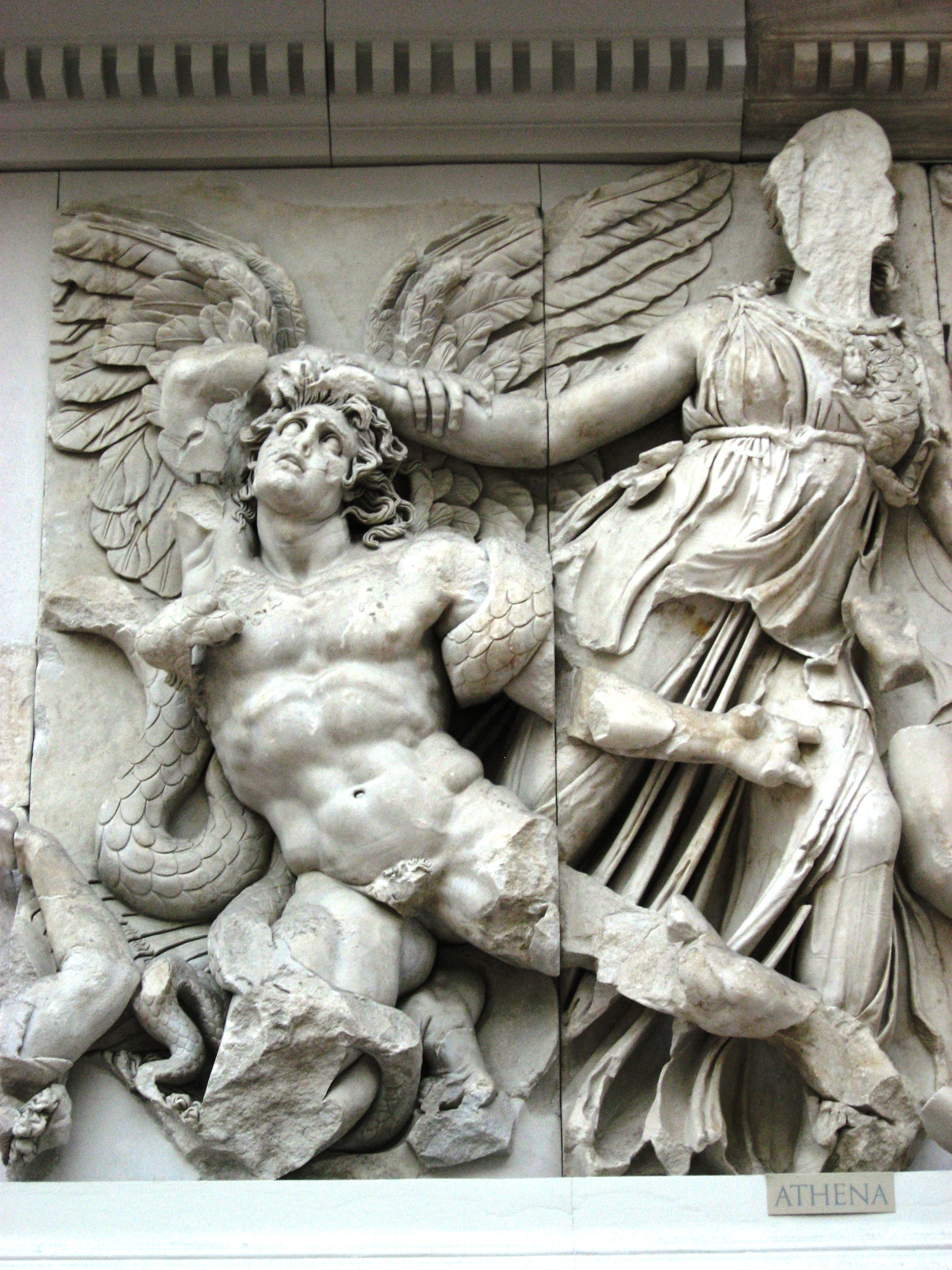
Hellenistic frieze: Battle of Gods and Titans, the Pergamon Altar.

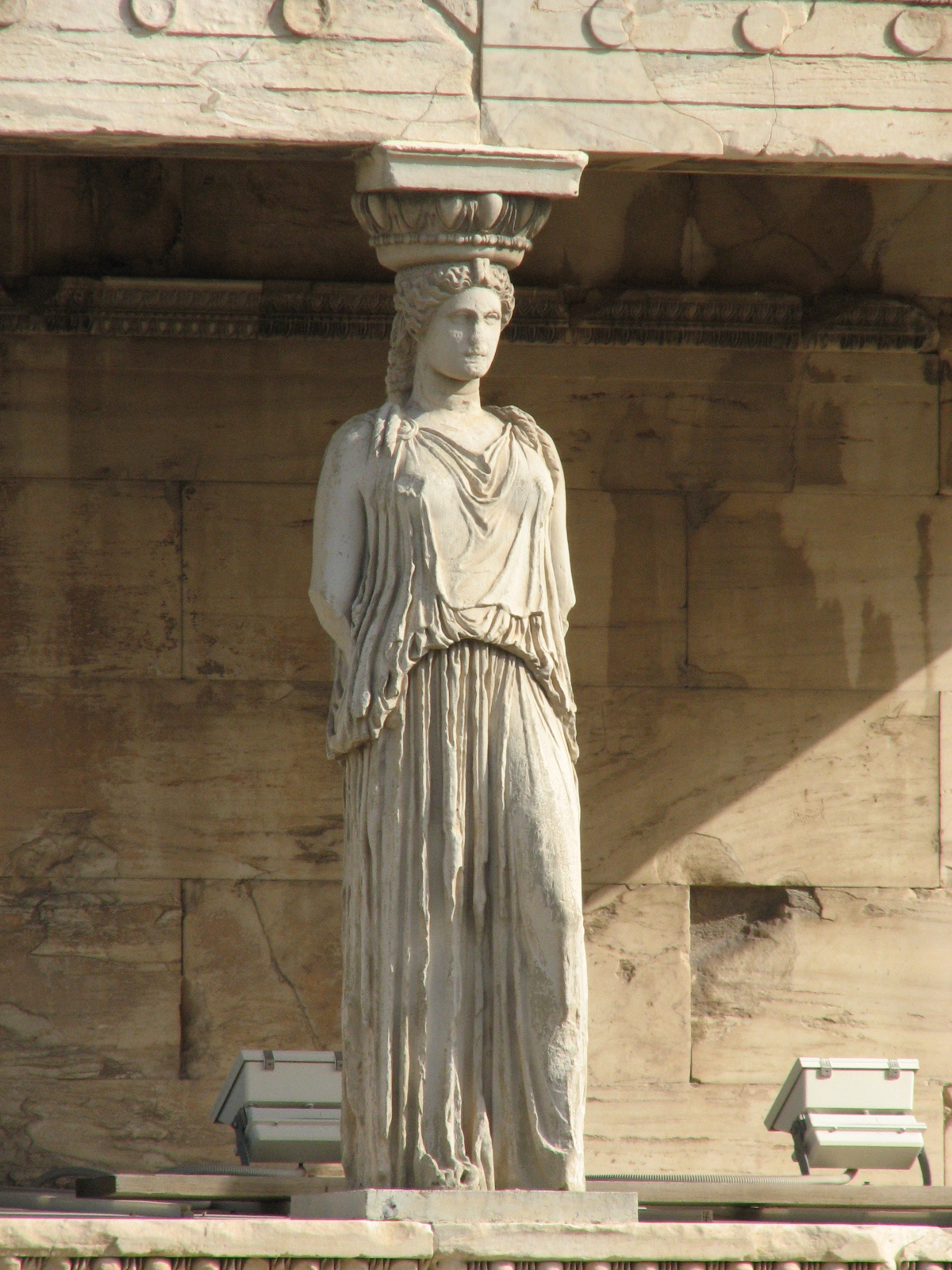
Ionic caryatid from the Erechtheion, Athens

== See also ==
- Ancient Greek art
- Ancient Roman architecture
- Byzantine architecture
- Classical architecture
- Greek culture
- Greek technology
- List of ancient architectural records
- List of ancient Greek temples
- Modern Greek architecture
- Outline of classical architecture
