= List of ancient Greek and Roman monoliths =

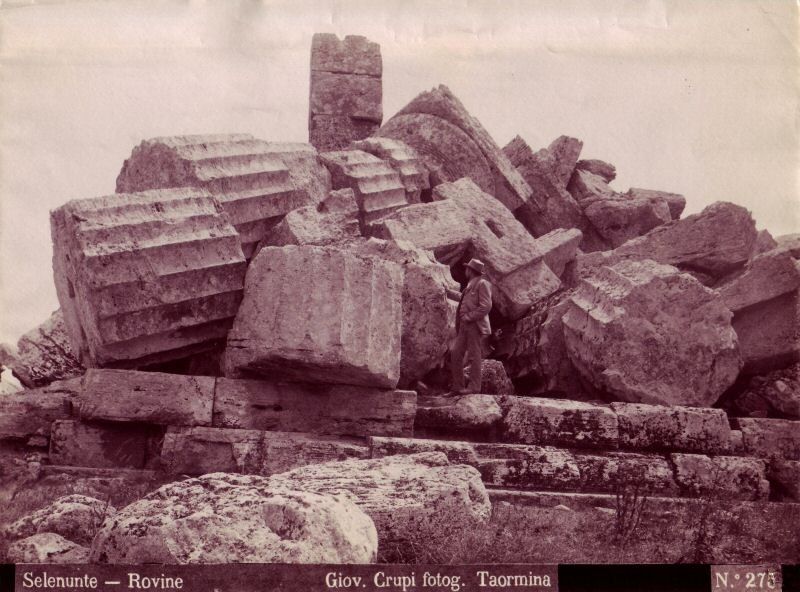
Man amidst the collapsed giant columns of a Greek temple at Selinunte, Sicily

This is a list of ancient monoliths found in all types of Greek and Roman buildings.

It contains monoliths

- quarried, but not moved
- quarried and moved
- quarried, moved and lifted clear off the ground into their position (architraves etc.)
- quarried, moved and erected in an upright position (columns etc.)

Transporting was done by land or water (or a combination of both), in the later case often by special-built ships such as obelisk carriers. For lifting operations, ancient cranes were employed since ca. 515 BC, such as in the construction of Trajan's Column.

It should be stressed that all numbers are estimations since only in the rarest cases have monoliths been actually weighed. Rather, weight is calculated by multiplying volume by density. The main source, J. J. Coulton, assumes 2.75 t/m^{3} for marble and 2.25 t/m^{3} for other stone. For an explanation of the large margin of error, which often leads to widely differing numbers, see these introductory remarks.

== Greek monoliths ==
Below a selection of Greek monoliths sorted by their date.

Date	Building / Object	Location	Monolith	Weight (in t)	Comment
~650 BC	Dedication of Nikandre	Delos, Greek isles	Figure	0.25	
~650 BC	Fortification wall	Leontinoi, Sicily	Wall blocks	1.75	
~640 BC	Temple of Poseidon	Isthmus, Greek mainland	Wall blocks	0.5	
~630 BC	Temple A	Prinias, Crete	Frieze slab	0.5	
610–590 BC	Sounion Kouros	Sounion, Greek mainland	Figure	~2	
610–590 BC	Colossus of the Naxians	Delos, Greek isles	Base	34	
610–590 BC	Colossus of the Naxians	Delos, Greek isles	Figure	~23	
590–580 BC	Temple of Artemis	Kerkyra, Greek isles	Pediment slab, central	3.25	
590–580 BC	Temple of Artemis	Kerkyra, Greek isles	Architrave block	5 or 6.25	
~565 BC	Temple of Apollo	Syracuse, Sicily	Stylobate block	24	
~565 BC	Temple of Apollo	Syracuse, Sicily	Column shaft	35	
~565 BC	Temple of Apollo	Syracuse, Sicily	Architrave block	20.25	
~555 BC	Olympieion	Syracuse, Sicily	Stylobate block	20.25	
560–550 BC	Temple of Artemis	Ephesos, Asia Minor	Architrave block, central	41.25	
550–530 BC	Temple C	Selinunte, Sicily	Stylobate block	12.5	
550–530 BC	Temple C	Selinunte, Sicily	Architrave block	16	
~540 BC	Temple of Apollo	Corinth, Greek mainland	Column shaft	26	
~540 BC	Temple of Apollo	Corinth, Greek mainland	Architrave block	10	
~535 BC	Temple D	Selinunte, Sicily	Architrave block	13.75	
~525 BC	Temple FS	Selinunte, Sicily	Architrave block	21	
~520 BC	Kouros of Apollonas	Naxos, Greek isles	Figure	~69	
~520 BC	Temple of Apollo	Naxos, Greek isles	Lintel block	22	
~520 BC	Temple of Apollo	Naxos, Greek isles	Threshold	22.25	
~520 BC	Temple at Parikia	Paros, Greek isles	Lintel block	~22	
~520–409 BC	Temple of Apollo ('GT')	Selinunte, Sicily	Column drum in quarry (Cave di Cusa)	73	
~520–409 BC	Temple of Apollo ('GT')	Selinunte, Sicily	Architrave block	40	
~520–409 BC	Temple of Apollo ('GT')	Selinunte, Sicily	Cornice block	12.5	
~515 BC	From about that time on, cranes are assumed to have become common on Greek construction sites, leading to a sharp reduction of block sizes.				
~515 BC	Olympieion	Athens, Greek mainland	Column drum	9	
~500–406 BC	Olympieion	Akragas, Sicily	Abacus block, central	11.5	
~500–406 BC	Olympieion	Akragas, Sicily	Architrave block	9.25	
~500–406 BC	Olympieion	Akragas, Sicily	Architrave block	11	
~500–406 BC	Olympieion	Akragas, Sicily	Architrave block	14	
~500–406 BC	Olympieion	Akragas, Sicily	Metope block, lower (angle)	13.5	
~500–406 BC	Olympieion	Akragas, Sicily	Cornice block	11.5	
~500 BC	Temple of Aphaia	Aigina, Greek isles	Column shaft	6	
480–460 BC	Temple ER	Selinunte, Sicily	Architrave block	17	
468–457 BC	Temple of Zeus	Olympia, Greek mainland	Stylobate block	8.5	
468–457 BC	Temple of Zeus	Olympia, Greek mainland	Architrave block	16.5	
~460 BC	Temple of 'Poseidon'	Paestum, Magna Graecia	Architrave block	11.5	
448–437 BC	Parthenon	Athens, Greek mainland	Architrave block	9.5	
448–437 BC	Parthenon	Athens, Greek mainland	Lintel block, largest	9	
437–432 BC	Propylaia	Athens, Greek mainland	Architrave block, central	12.5	
437–432 BC	Propylaia	Athens, Greek mainland	Lintel block, largest	12.25	
437–432 BC	Propylaia	Athens, Greek mainland	Lintel block, relieving (Note: If in two blocks.)	8.75	
437–432 BC	Propylaia	Athens, Greek mainland	Ceiling beam, west porch	10	
421–405 BC	Erechtheion	Athens, Greek mainland	Block over Pandroseion	11.5	
421–405 BC	Erechtheion	Athens, Greek mainland	Lintel block, north door	7.25	
421–405 BC	Erechtheion	Athens, Greek mainland	Ceiling beam, north porch	10	
~420 BC	Temple of Segesta	Segesta, Sicily	Architrave block	12.5	
366–326 BC	Temple of Apollo	Delphi, Greek mainland	Architrave block	9.25	
~340 BC	Temple of Zeus	Nemea, Greek mainland	Architrave block	6.75	
~340 BC	Temple of Zeus	Nemea, Greek mainland	Lintel block	8.75	
~350 BC	First in Ionia, the weight of the lifted blocks begins to match again that of the Archaic period, indicating a mastery of the winch and compound pulley hoist by now.				
~310 BC	Temple of Apollo	Didyma, Asia Minor	Threshold	46.75	
~310 BC	Temple of Apollo	Didyma, Asia Minor	Lintel block (Note: If monolithic.)	48	
~310 BC	Temple of Apollo	Didyma, Asia Minor	Jamb	71.5	
~170 BC	Olympieion	Athens, Greek mainland	Architrave block, largest	23.25	

== Roman monoliths ==
Below a selection of Roman monoliths sorted by their date; the list also includes work on Greek temples which was continued into the Roman era.

Date (Note: In case of Egyptian obelisks, date of ship transport to Rome.)	Building / Object	Location	Monolith	Weight (in t)	Comment
1st c. BC	Apollo statue	Vitr. 10.2.13	Base	51?	
10 BC	Flaminian Obelisk	Rome, Italia	Obelisk	263	From Roman Egypt by obelisk ship
10 BC	Campensis Obelisk	Rome, Italia	Obelisk	230	From Roman Egypt by obelisk ship
37–41 AD	Vatican Obelisk	Rome, Italia	Obelisk	361	From Roman Egypt by obelisk ship
1st–2nd c.	Temple of Jupiter	Baalbek, Roman Lebanon	Column drum, lower	48.5	
1st–2nd c.	Temple of Jupiter	Baalbek, Roman Lebanon	Architrave-frieze block, central	63	Lifted by cranes to height of 19 m
1st–2nd c.	Temple of Jupiter	Baalbek, Roman Lebanon	Cornice block, corner	108	Lifted by cranes to height of 19 m
1st–3rd c.	Granite column	Mons Claudianus, Roman Egypt	Column shaft in quarry	207	
113	Trajan's Column	Rome, Italia	Pedestal	~77	
113	Trajan's Column	Rome, Italia	Base	55	
113	Trajan's Column	Rome, Italia	Column drum, typical	~32	
113	Trajan's Column	Rome, Italia	Capital	53.3	Lifted by cranes to height of 34 m
2nd c.?	Temple of Apollo	Didyma, Asia Minor	Architrave block	20.5	
297	Pompey's Pillar	Alexandria, Roman Egypt	Column shaft	285	
306–313	Basilica Nova	Rome, Italia	Column shaft	103	
357	Lateran Obelisk	Rome, Italia	Obelisk	455	From Roman Egypt by obelisk ship
530	Mausoleum of Theodoric	Ravenna, Italia	Roof slab	230	Constructed under Ostrogoths (Note: Although the mausoleum reflects Ostrogothic style, the method for moving the monolithic roof slab and positioning it on top of the building relied on the continuity of Roman techniques into the reign of Theoderic.)

== Gallery ==
=== Greek monoliths ===
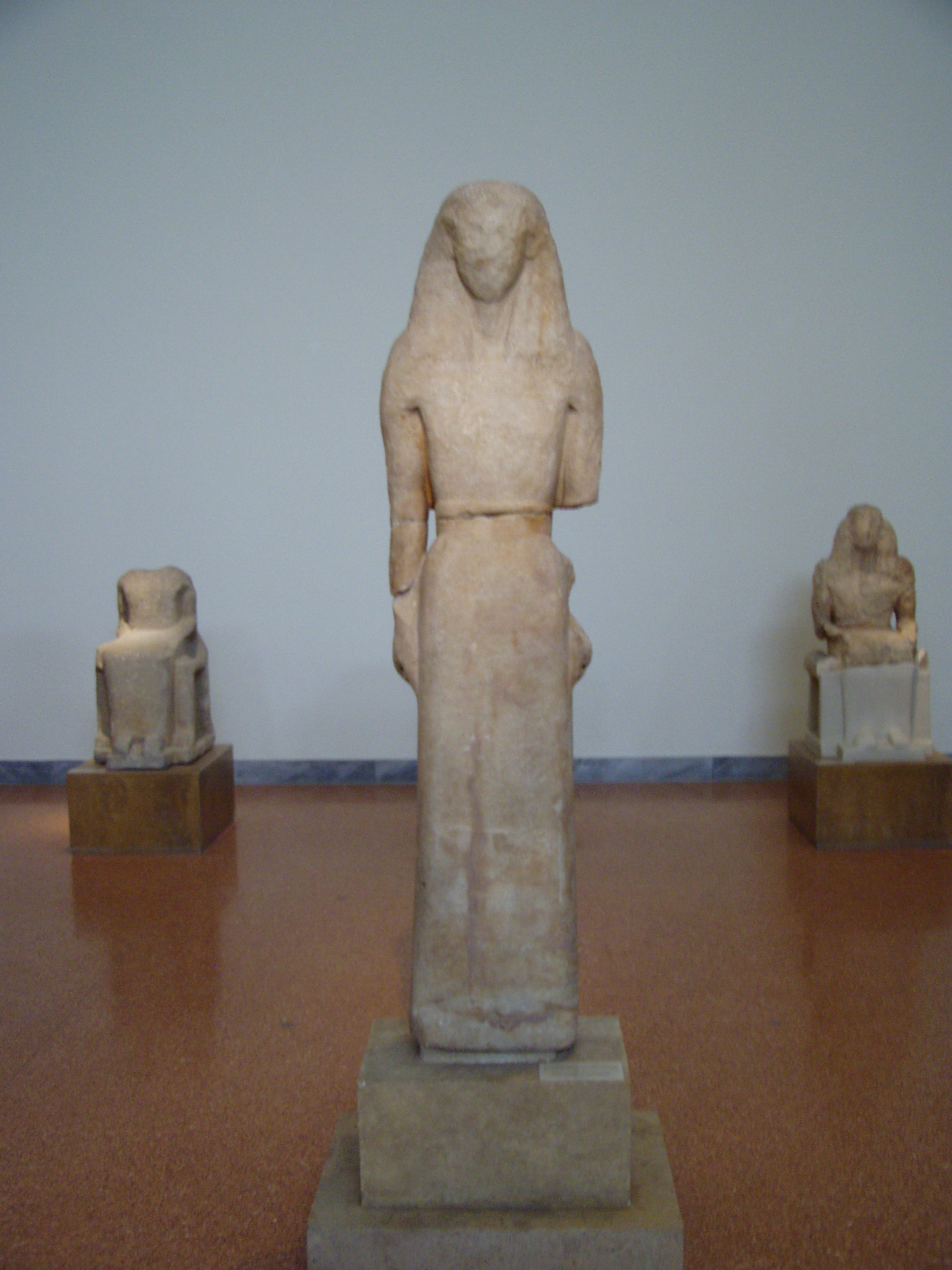
Nikandre Dedication (0.25 t)

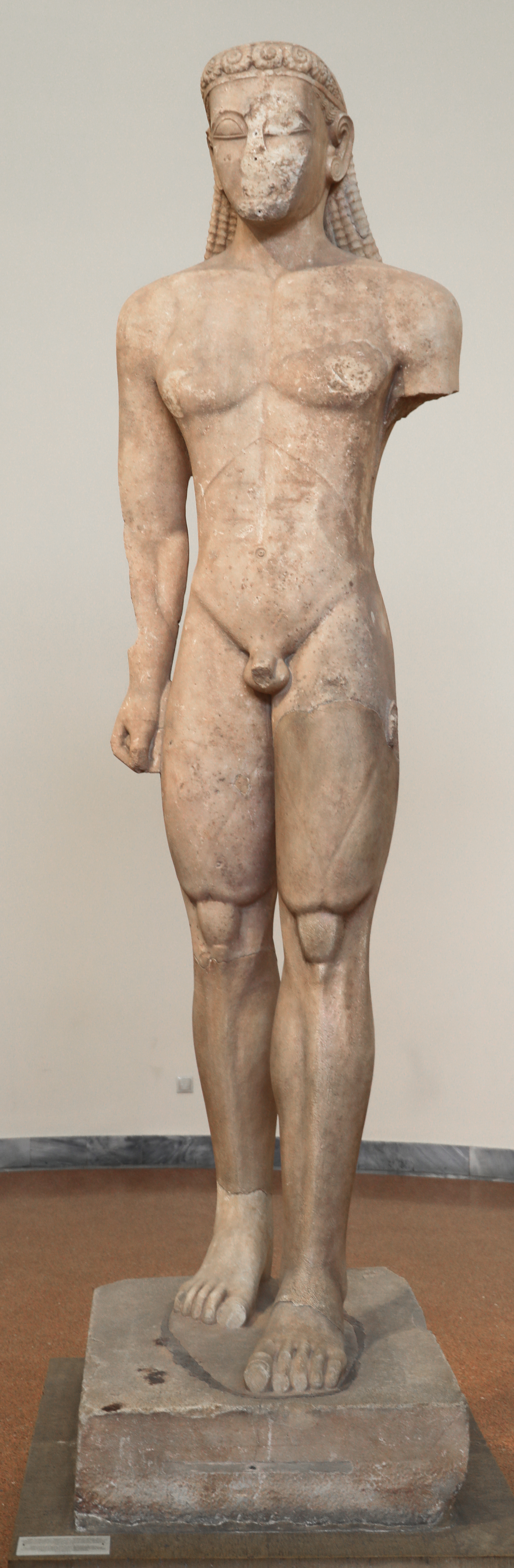
Sounion Kouros (~2 t)

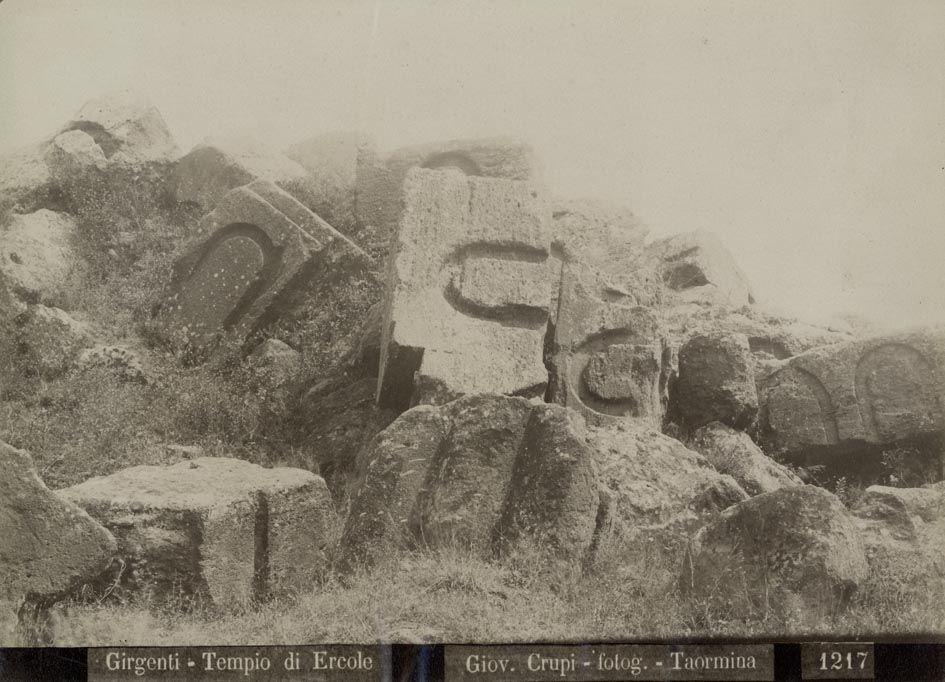
The existence of the U-shaped channels on the stone blocks (here at the Temple of Heracles) points at the use of cranes for lifting them into place.

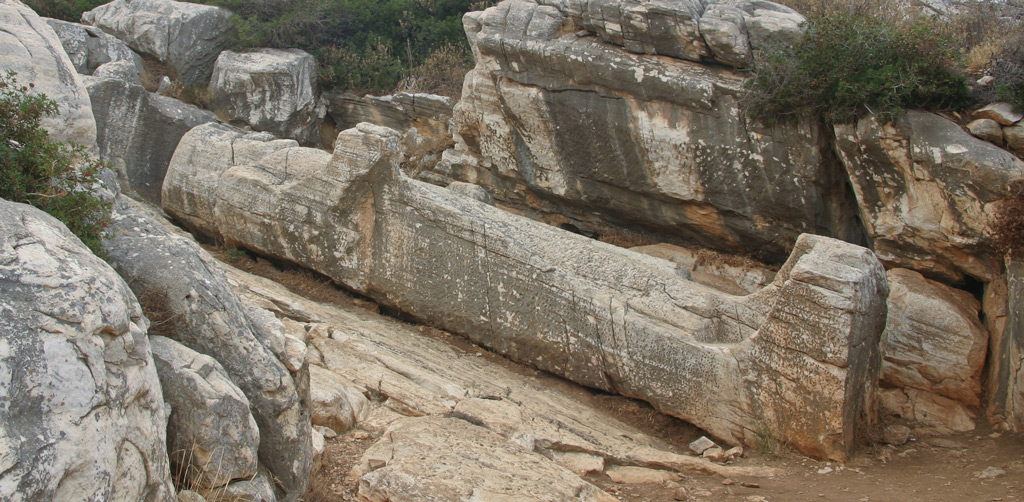
Colossos of Apollona (~69 t)

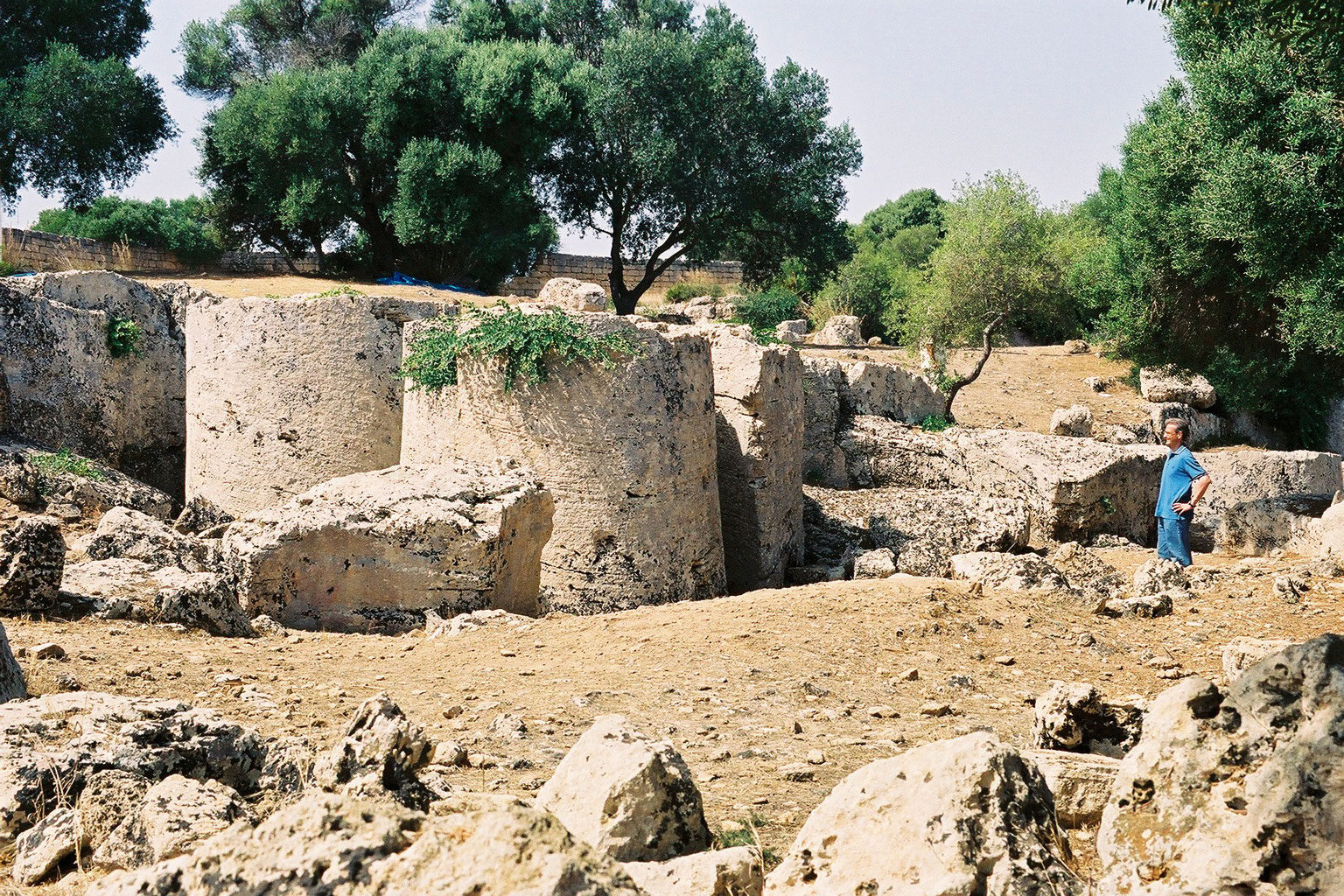
Column drum(s) in Cave di Cusa (73 t)

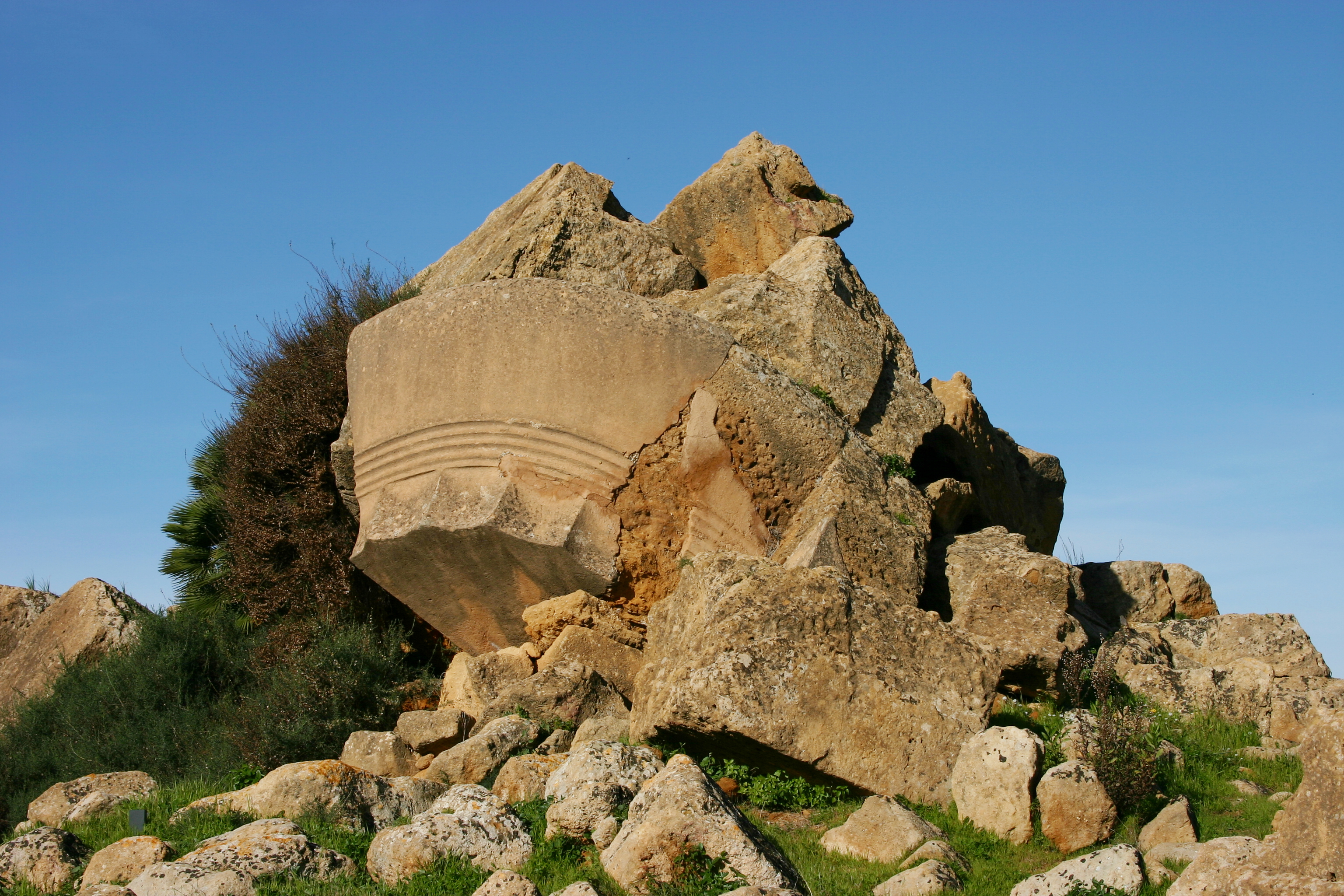
Huge doric capital, Temple of Olympian Zeus, Agrigento

=== Roman monoliths ===
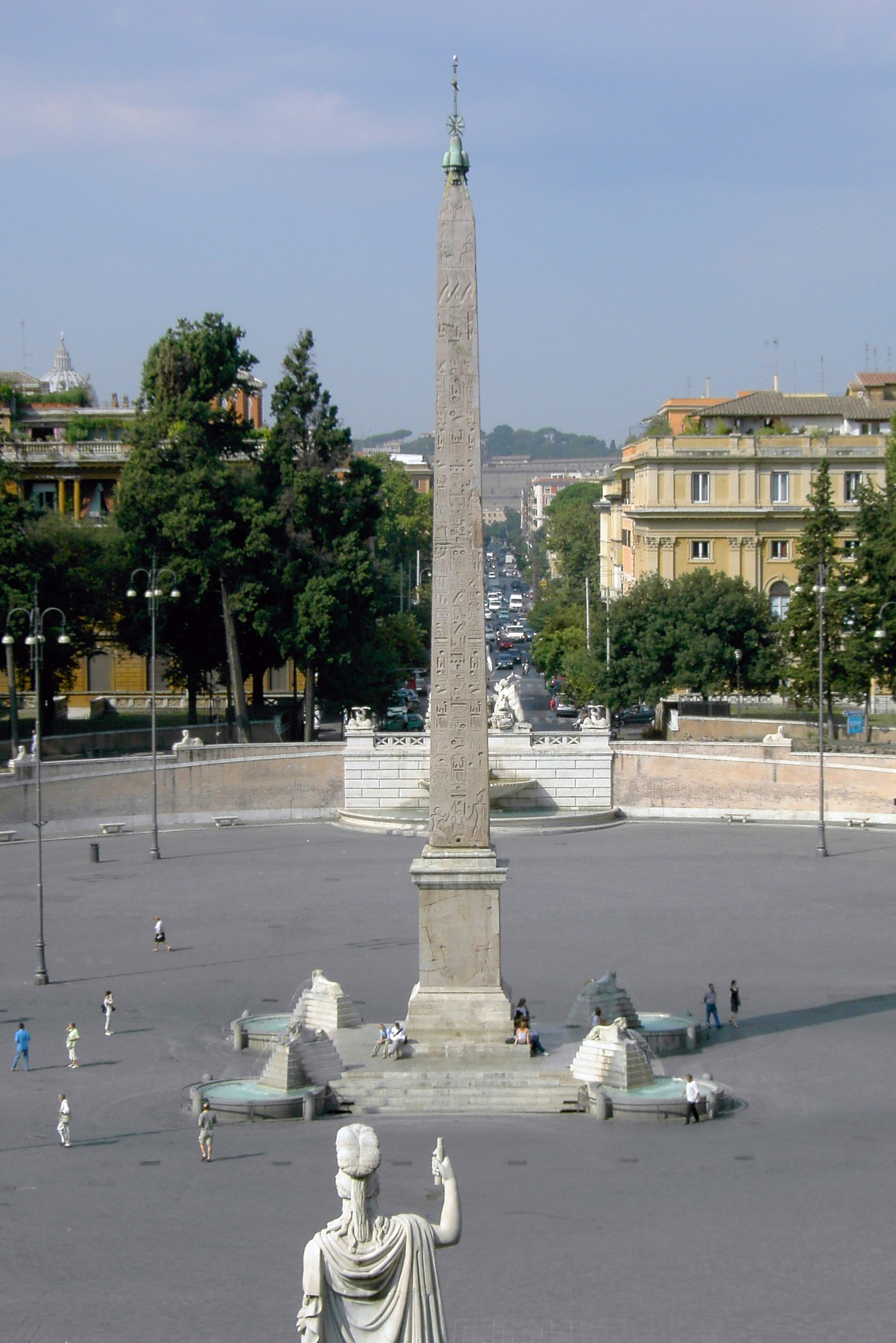
Flaminian Obelisk (263 t)

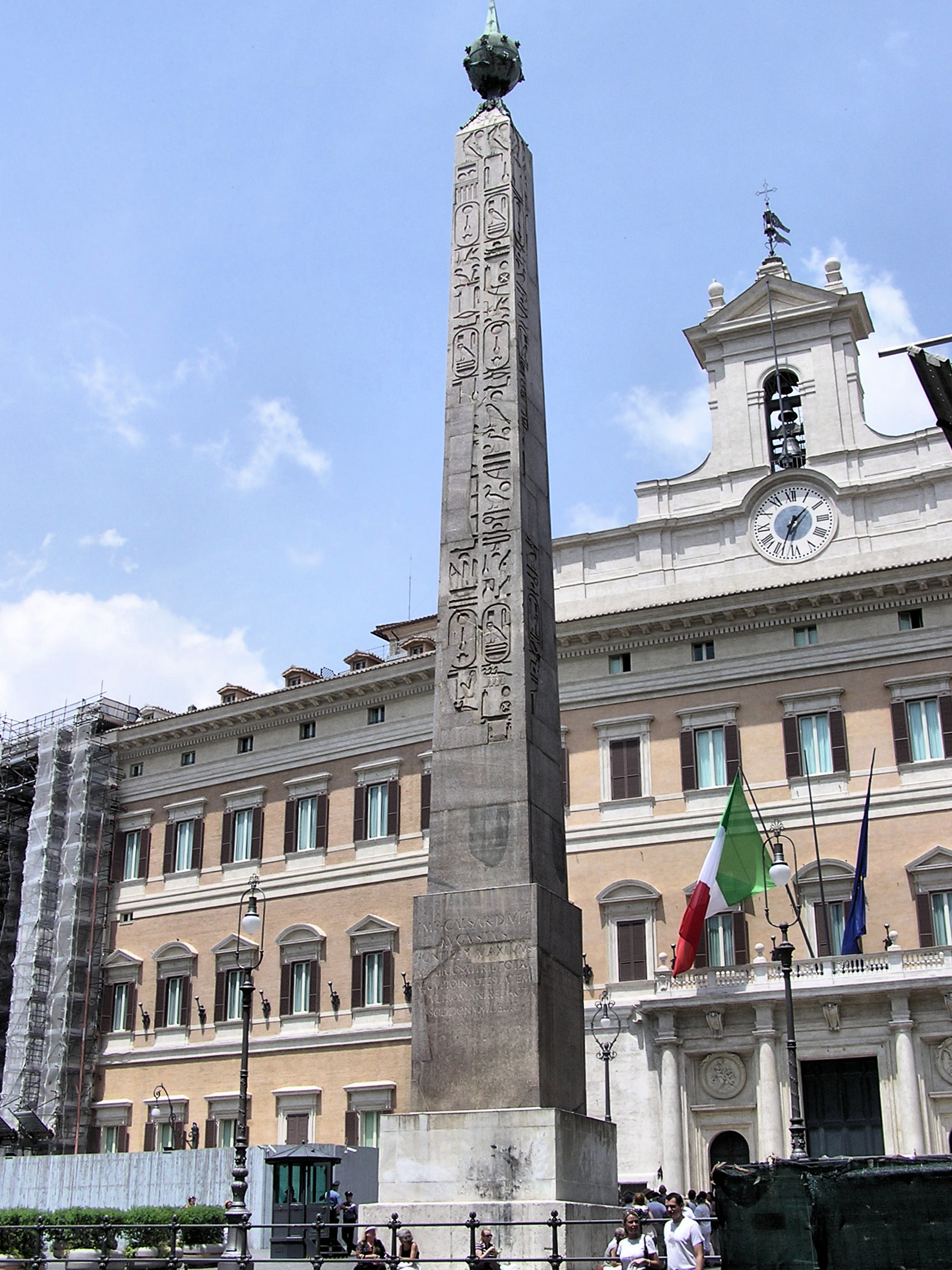
Campensis Obelisk (230 t)

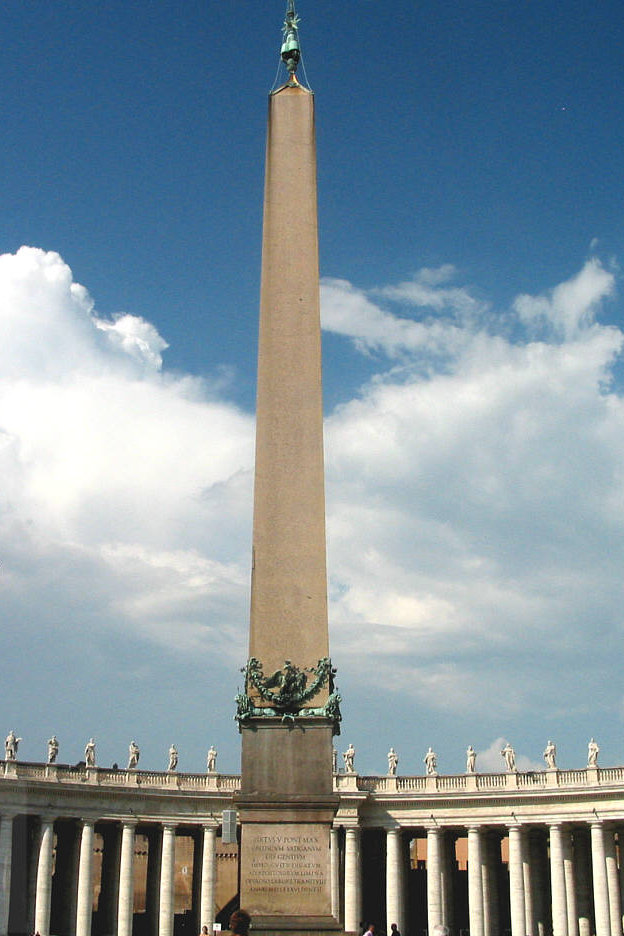
Vatican Obelisk (330 t)

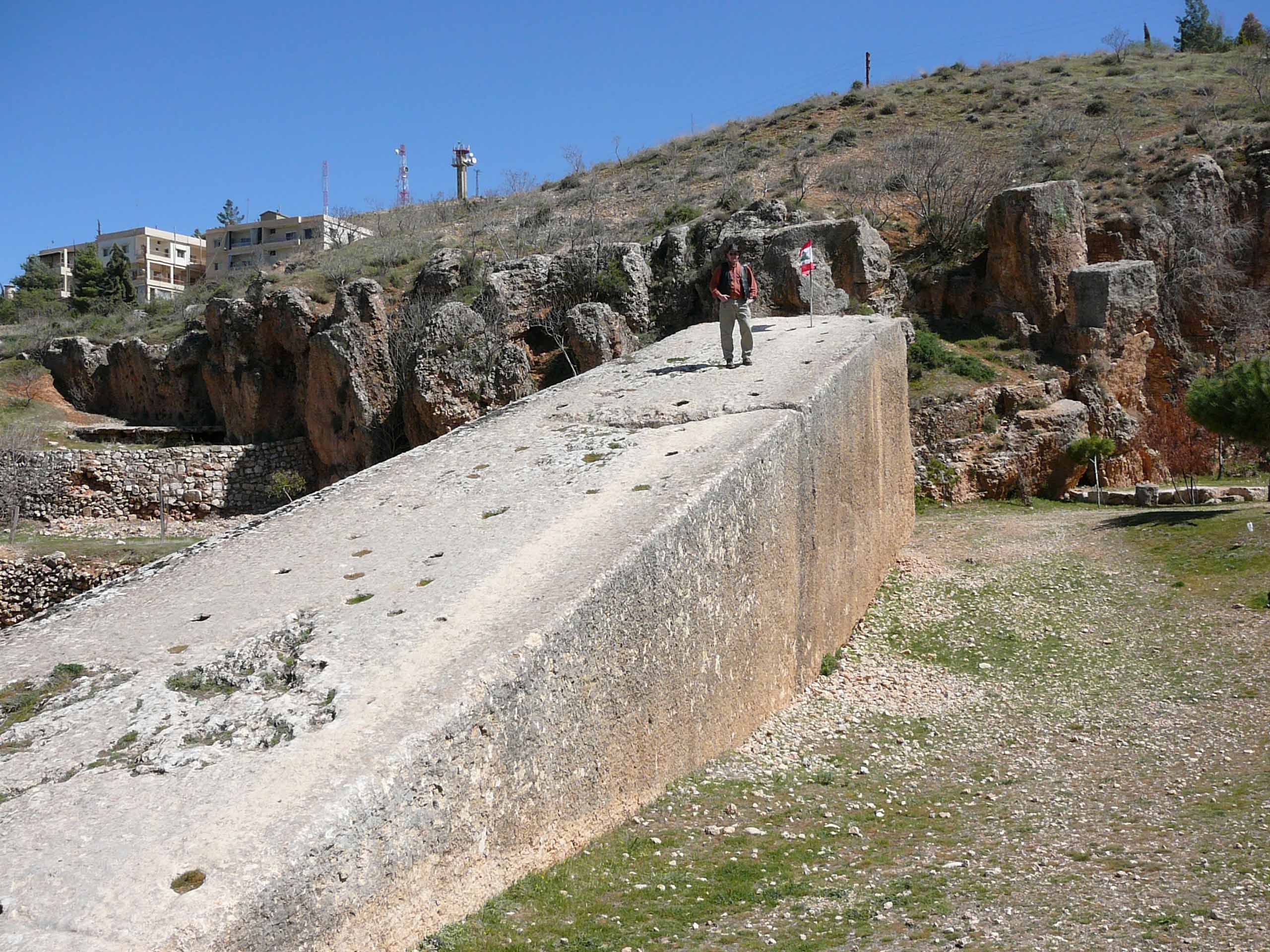
Stone of the South (~1,000 t)

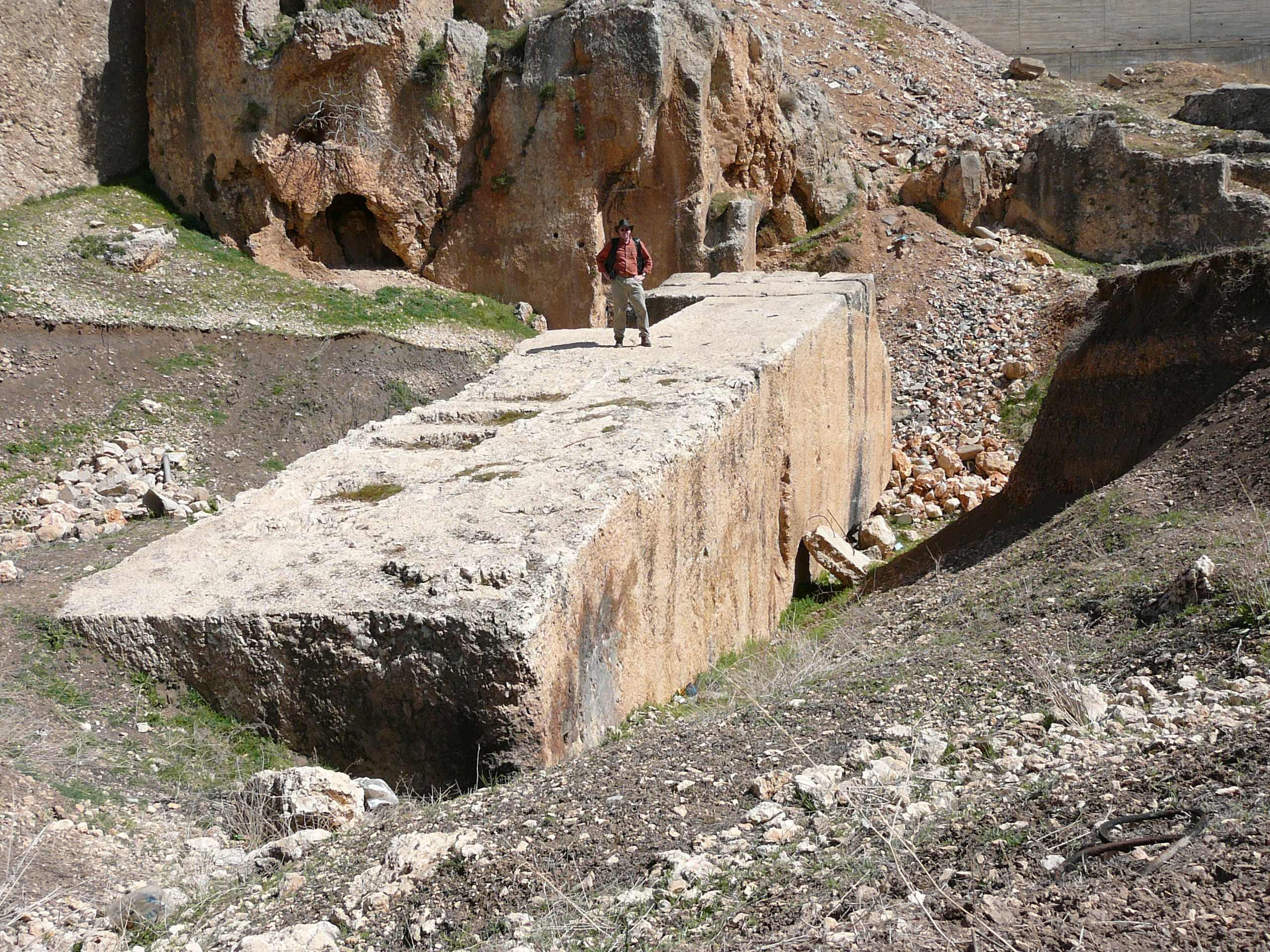
Unnamed monolith (1,242 t)

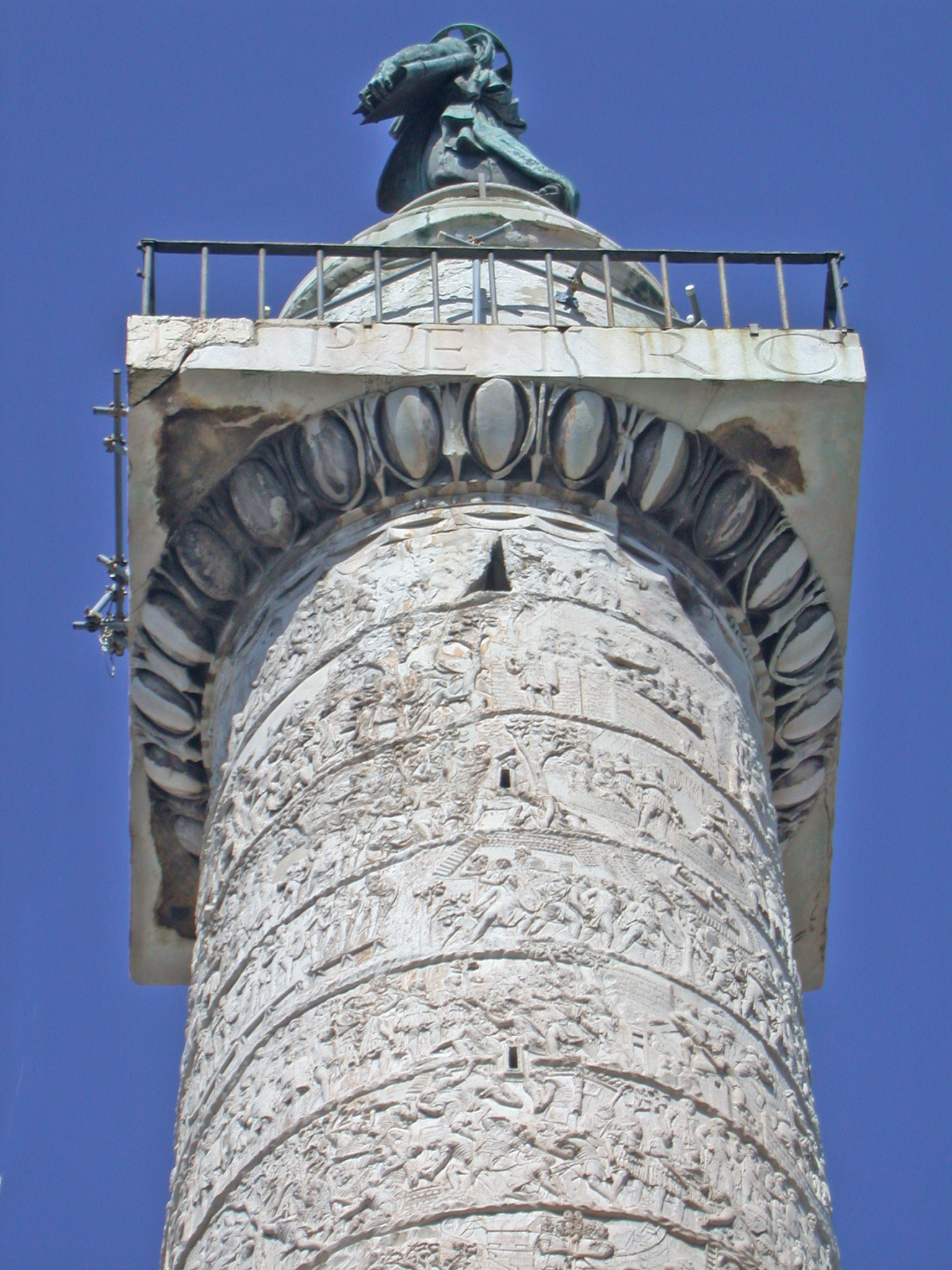
Capital of Trajan's Column (53.3 t)

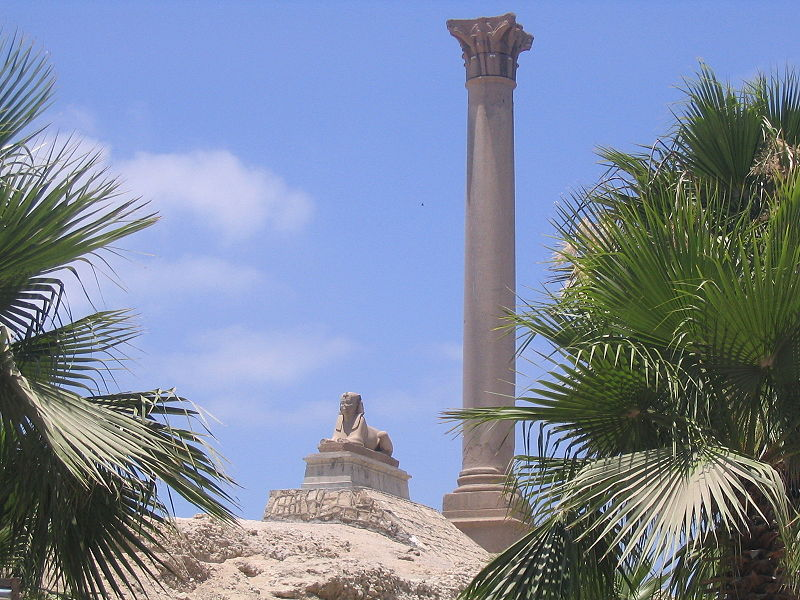
Shaft of Pompey's Pillar (285 t)

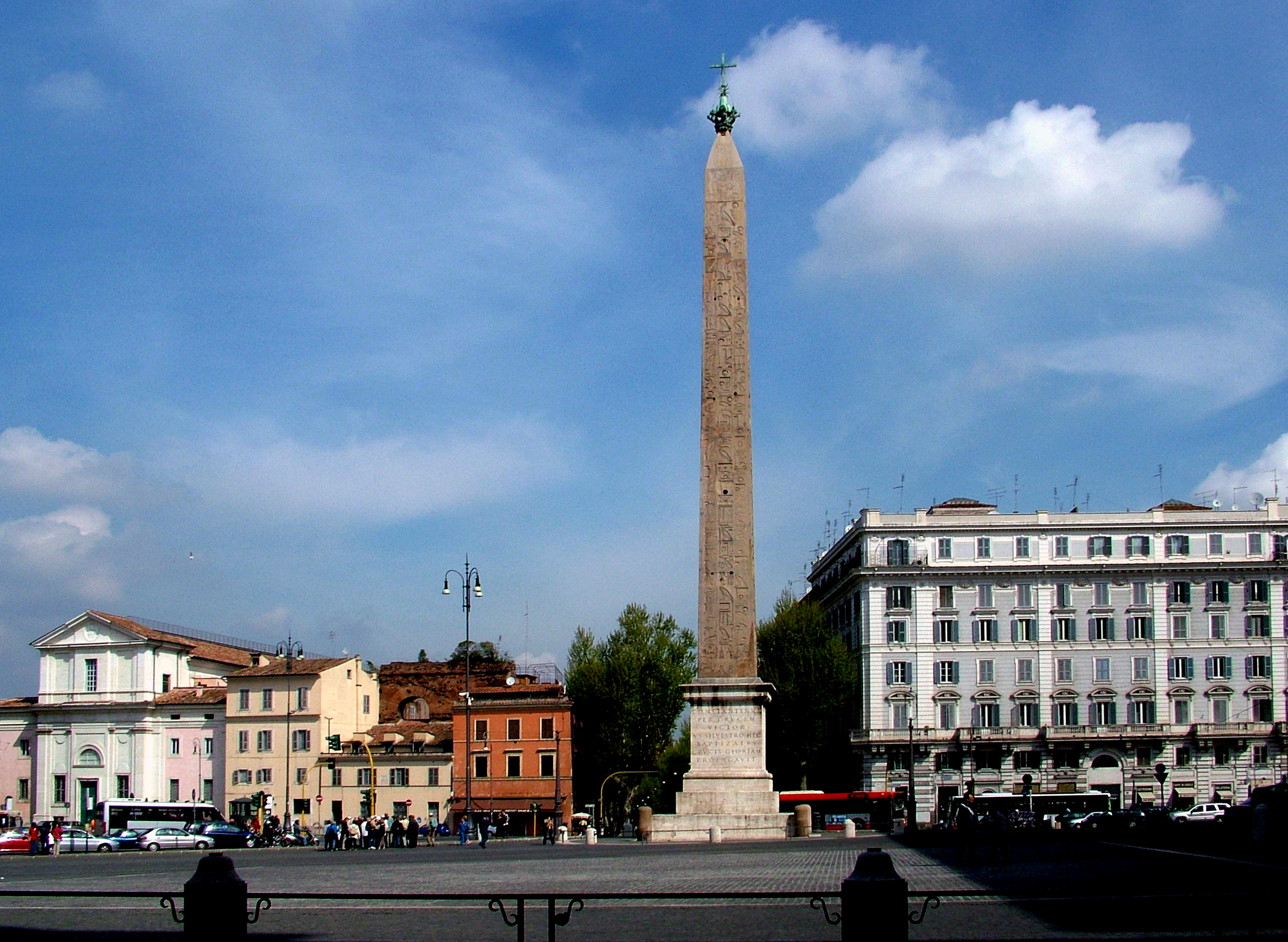
Lateran Obelisk (455 t)

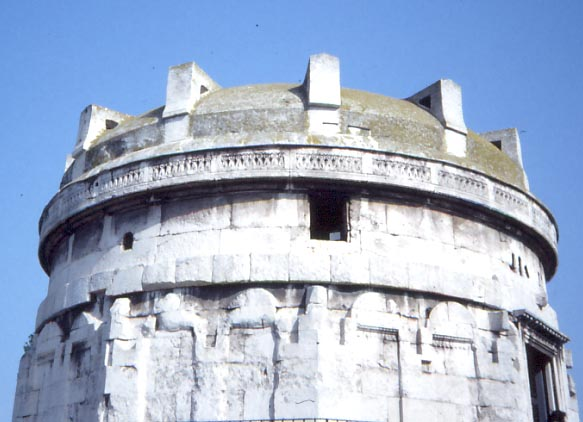
Roof slab of Mausoleum of Theodoric (230 t)

== See also ==
- Record-holding monoliths in antiquity
- List of largest monoliths in the world
- List of obelisks in Rome

== Sources ==
- Adam, Jean-Pierre (1977), "À propos du trilithon de Baalbek: Le transport et la mise en oeuvre des mégalithes", Syria, 54 (1/2): 31–63, doi:10.3406/syria.1977.6623
- Coulton, J. J. (1974), "Lifting in Early Greek Architecture", The Journal of Hellenic Studies, 94: 1–19, doi:10.2307/630416, JSTOR 630416, S2CID 162973494
- Heidenreich, Robert; Johannes, Heinz (1971), Das Grabmal Theoderichs zu Ravenna, Wiesbaden: Franz Steiner Verlag
- Jones, Mark Wilson (1993), "One Hundred Feet and a Spiral Stair: The Problem of Designing Trajan's Column", Journal of Roman Archaeology, 6: 23–38, doi:10.1017/S1047759400011454, S2CID 250348951
- Lancaster, Lynne (1999), "Building Trajan's Column", American Journal of Archaeology, 103 (3): 419–439, doi:10.2307/506969, JSTOR 506969, S2CID 192986322
- Maxfield, Valerie A. (2001), "Stone Quarrying in the Eastern Desert with Particular Reference to Mons Claudianus and Mons Porphyrites", in Mattingly, David J.; Salmon, John (eds.), Economies Beyond Agriculture in the Classical World, Leicester-Nottingham Studies in Ancient Society, vol. 9, London: Routledge, pp. 143–170, ISBN 0-415-21253-7
- Ruprechtsberger, Erwin M. (1999), "Vom Steinbruch zum Jupitertempel von Heliopolis/Baalbek (Libanon)", Linzer Archäologische Forschungen, 30: 7–56
