= HMS Tetrarch (N77) =

Submarine of the Royal Navy

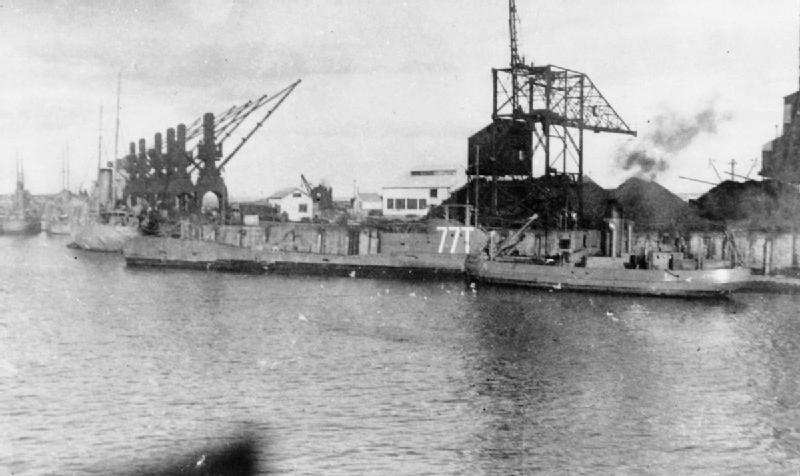
- HMS Tetrarch

History

United Kingdom
- Name: HMS Tetrarch
- Builder: Vickers-Armstrongs, Barrow
- Laid down: 24 August 1938
- Launched: 14 November 1939
- Commissioned: 15 February 1940
- Identification: Pennant number N77
- Fate: Sunk 2 November 1941
- Badge

General characteristics
- Class & type: British T class submarine
- Displacement: 1,090 tons surfaced; 1,575 tons submerged
- Length: 275 ft (84 m)
- Beam: 26 ft 6 in (8.08 m)
- Draught: 16.3 ft (5.0 m)
- Propulsion: Two shafts; Twin diesel engines 2,500 hp (1.86 MW) each; Twin electric motors 1,450 hp (1.08 MW) each
- Speed: 15.25 knots (28.7 km/h) surfaced; 9 knots (20 km/h) submerged
- Range: 4,500 nautical miles at 11 knots (8,330 km at 20 km/h) surfaced
- Test depth: 300 ft (91 m) max
- Complement: 59
- Armament: 6 internal forward-facing 21-inch (533 mm) torpedo tubes; 4 external forward-facing torpedo tubes; 6 reload torpedoes; 1 x 4-inch (102 mm) deck gun

HMS Tetrarch (N77) was a T-class submarine of the Royal Navy. She was laid down by Vickers-Armstrongs, Barrow and launched in November 1939.

== Career ==
In common with many of her class, Tetrarch saw extensive service in the key naval theatres, Home waters, serving in the North Sea and off the French and Scandinavian coasts, and the Mediterranean.

=== Home waters ===
Tetrarch's first success came in May 1940 when she torpedoed and sank the German submarine chaser UJ B / Treff V in the Skagerrak. She also sank the Danish fishing vessel Terieven and the German tanker Samland, and captured the Danish fishing vessel Emmanuel, which was taken to Leith as a prize.

=== Mediterranean ===
Tetrarch was assigned to operate in the Mediterranean in late 1940. She sank the Italian merchants Snia Amba, Giovinezza and Citta di Bastia, the Italian tanker Persiano, the Italian sailing vessels V 72/Fratelli Garre, V 113/Francesco Garre and Nicita, and the Greek sailing vessel Panagiotis Kramottos. She also damaged the German merchant Yalova and claimed to have damaged a sailing vessel in the Aegean. Tetrarch also carried out an unsuccessful attack on the Greek tanker Olympos.

== Sinking ==
Tetrach sailed from Malta on 26 October 1941 for a refit in Britain, via Gibraltar. She failed to arrive in Gibraltar on 2 November and was declared overdue. Her route passed through a known minefield. On Monday 27 she communicated with P34, which was in the same area. This was the last contact with the submarine. She is presumed lost to Italian mines off Cape Granitola, Sicily, Italy in late October 1941.

Norman Walton, who later became the sole survivor of the sinking of HMS Neptune had visited the ship prior to its sailing to celebrate the birthday of a member of the Tetrarch, and upon realising it had sailed, he leapt off the ship and swam back to shore. His name had been added to the ship's roll as it left port, and after the ship vanished his parents were mistakenly notified he was missing in action.
