= Temple of Olympian Zeus =

The Temple of Olympian Zeus or Olympeion or Olympieum can refer to the following ancient Greek temples:

- Temple of Olympian Zeus, Agrigento
- Temple of Olympian Zeus, Athens
- Temple of Zeus at Olympia, Greece, built in the fifth century BC
- Temple of Olympian Zeus, at Megara
