= Kouroi of Flerio =

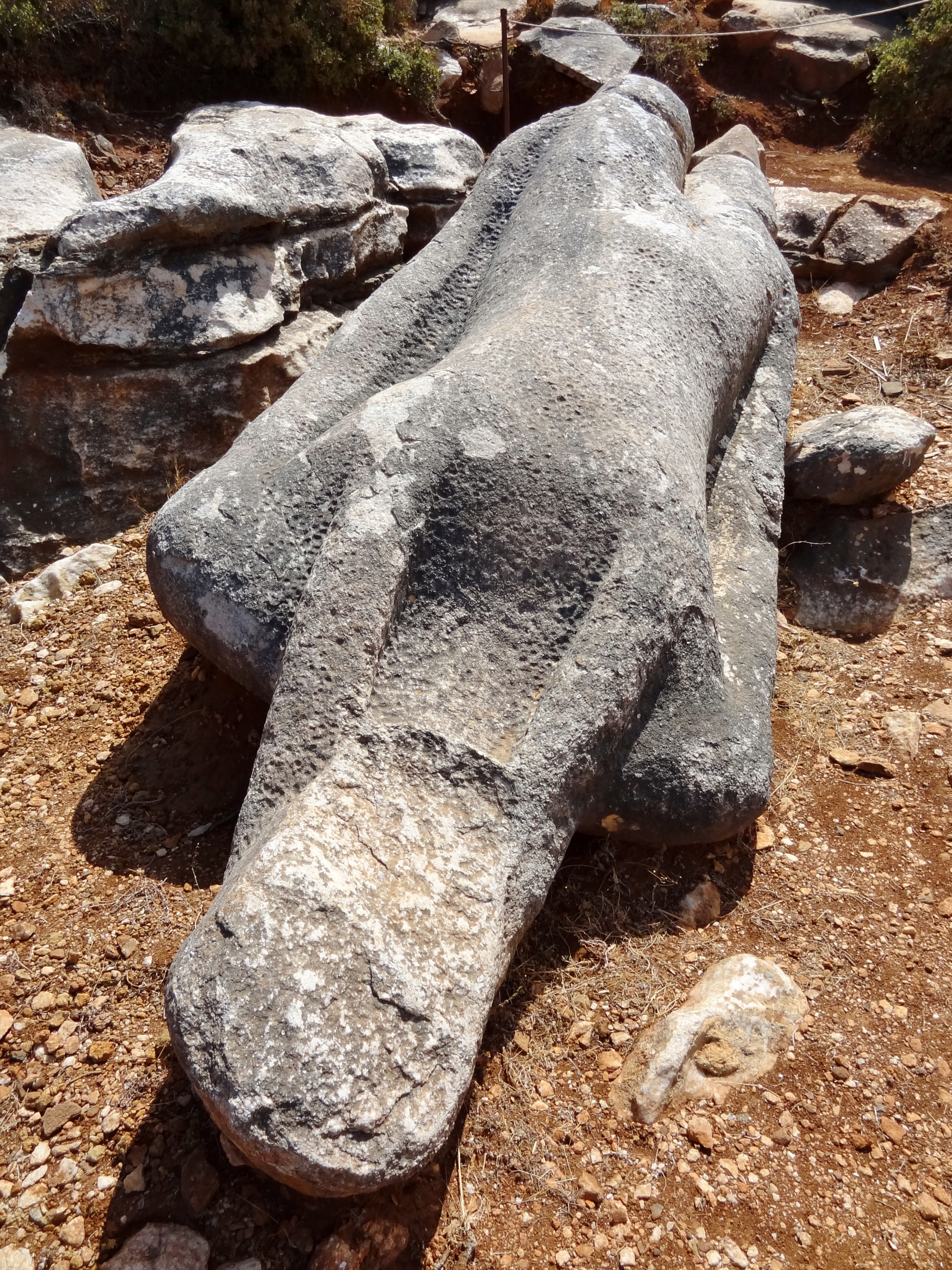
Kouros in the ancient quarry

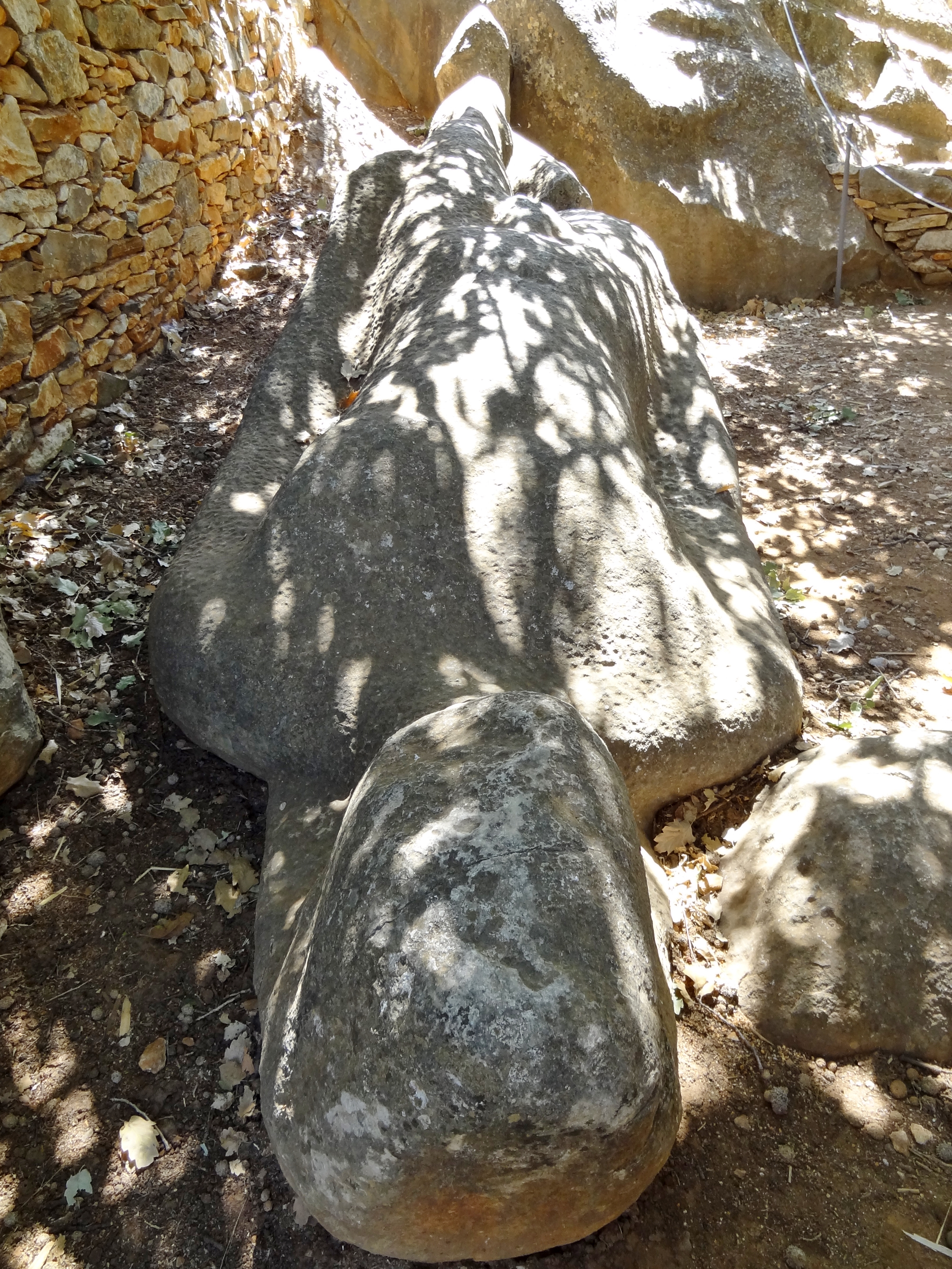
Kouros in the garden of Flerio

The Kouros of Flerio is 4.7 metre long statue (Kouros) of white Naxian marble, located in a village garden in Melanes, a small village on Naxos, one of the Cycladic islands, in Greece. A second, similar kouros is located in a quarry near Melanes. They each weigh between 5 and 7 tonnes. The largest kouros on Naxos at 10.45 metres long is the Kouros of Apollonas, which weighs 80 tonnes.

== Description ==
In most cases, kouros statues are depictions of naked male youths with their arms at their sides. Kouroi were created during the Archaic period in the 7th and 6th centuries BC. The Kouroi are the male equivalents of female statues, called Korai.

Both the Kouroi at Flerio are unfinished and made of Naxian marble. They were not completed with fine details, because their feet broke during transport.

=== Kouros in the garden of Flerio ===
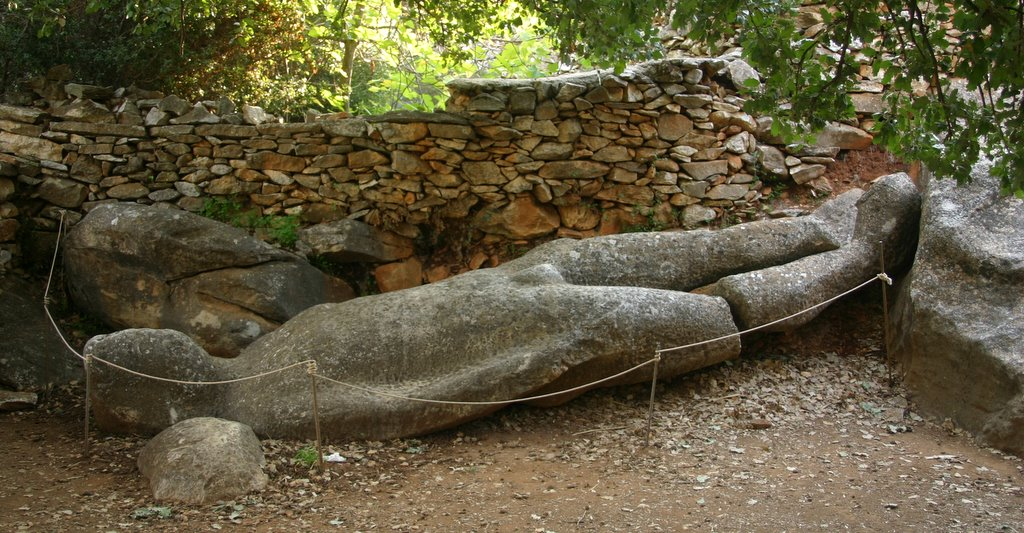
View of the kouros in the garden

Coordinates: 37°05′00.8″N 25°27′07.8″E

The kouros of Flerio lies in the shade of a rural garden. The figure is unfinished and had been roughly worked with chisels by ancient stonemasons. This is clear from the many dents, which cover the entire statue. Only the rough outline of the figure is visible. Its arms are at its sides and the lower right leg has broken off – though it still rests next to the kouros. The feet are entirely missing and it is assumed that they have broken off and that as a result the statue was abandoned in transit.

=== Kouros in the quarry of Flerio ===
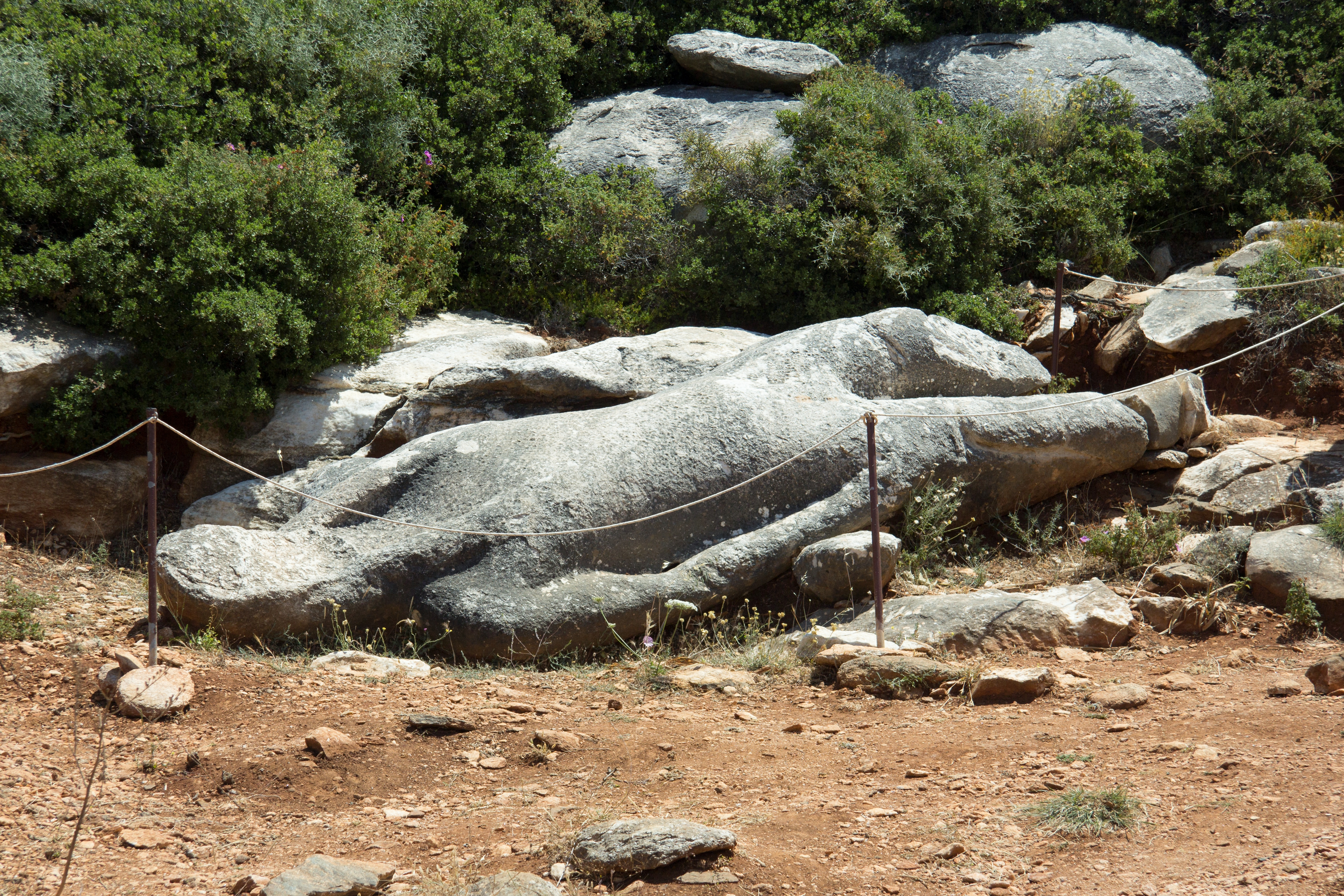
View of the kouros in the quarry

Coordinates: 37°04′52.1″N 25°27′14.2″E

The kouros in the quarry, also known as the Kouros of Potamia or the Kouros of Faranga, is located about halfway up a 300 metre high marble outcrop and is 5.0 metres long. This statue is also unfinished and its legs are also broken off, probably as a result of being dropped at the quarry during transport, in the spot where it still remains. The figure lies on its back, away from the rock from which it was originally cut. Further issues are visible. The face is missing, clear scratches are visible on the foot stumps. The roughly worked feet of the figure lie nearby, mounted on a much more recent concrete foundation.

== Context ==
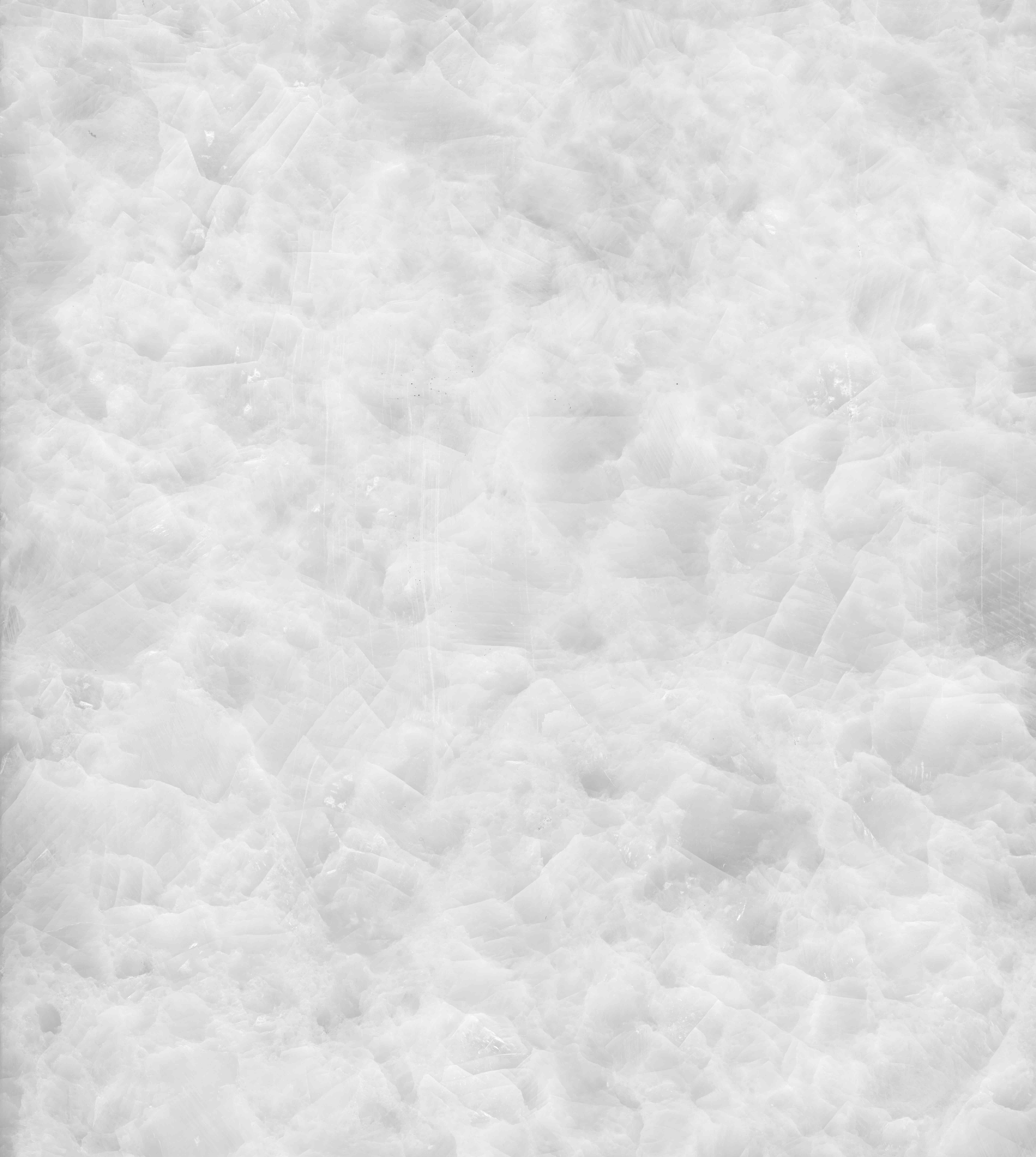
Pattern of Naxian marble

The Colossus of the Naxians, a 9 metre high kouros on Delos was quarried from the same quarry as both of the kouroi of Flerio.

== Bibliography ==
- Gottfried Gruben: "Naxos und Delos.2" Jahrbuch des Deutschen Archäologischen Instituts 1998. pp. 262 ff. Walter De Gruyter. Berlin 1998. ISBN 3-11-015369-6 Accessible online
- Marion Meyer/Nora Brüggemann: Kore und Kouros: Weihegaben für die Götter. Phoibos Verlag. Wien 2007. ISBN 3-901232-80-X.
