= Capo Granitola Lighthouse =

Lighthouse in Sicily, Italy

Capo Granitola
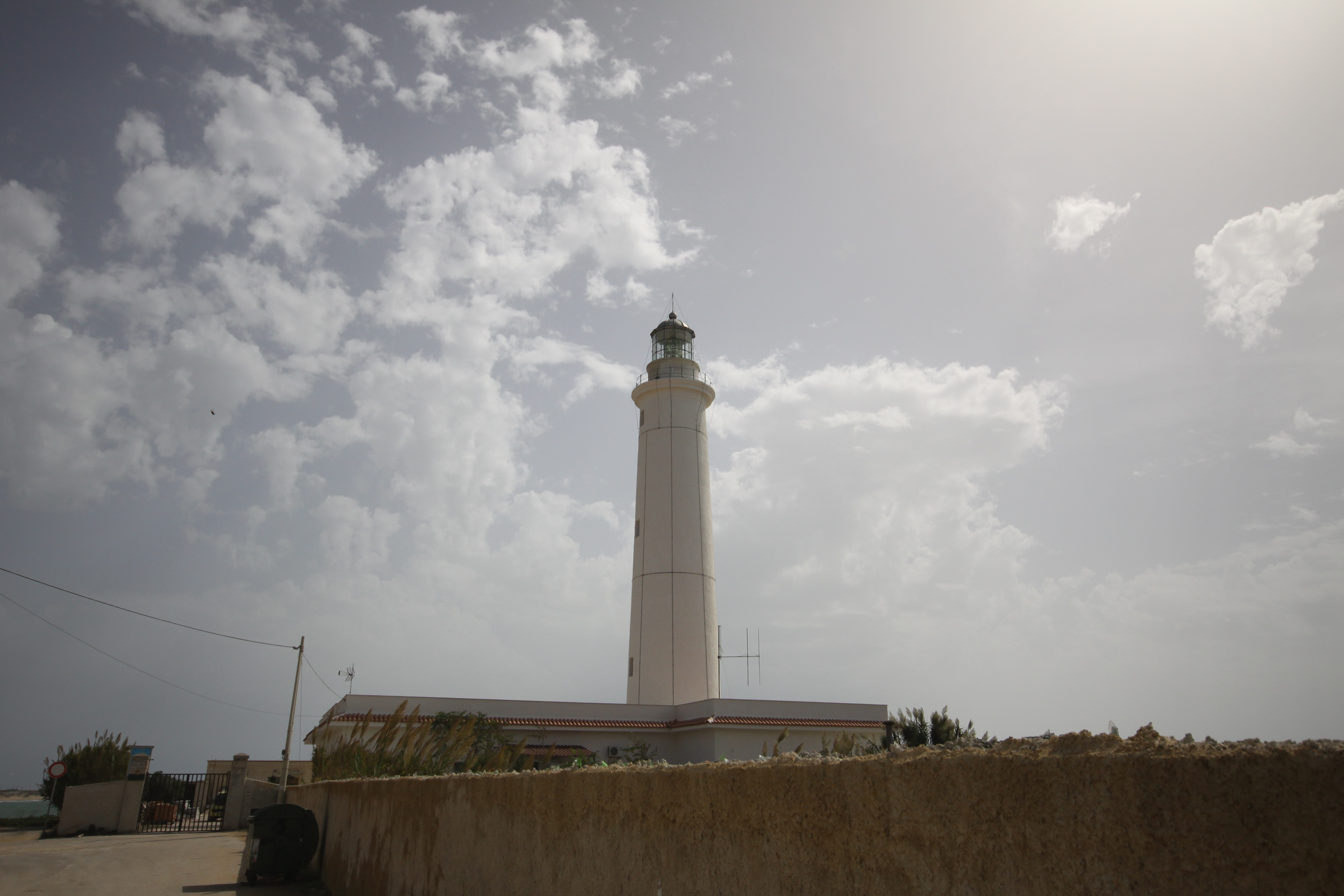
- Capo Granitola Lighthouse
- Location: Campobello di Mazara; Sicily; Italy
- Coordinates: 37°33′57″N 12°39′43″E

Tower
- Constructed: 1865
- Foundation: concrete base
- Construction: masonry tower
- Height: 35 metres (115 ft)
- Shape: cylindrical tower with balcony and lantern atop a 1-storey keeper's house
- Markings: white tower and lantern, grey metallic lantern dome
- Power source: mains electricity
- Operator: Marina Militare
- Fog signal: no

Light
- Focal height: 37 metres (121 ft)
- Lens: Type OF 1400; Focal length: 700mm
- Intensity: main: AL 1000 W reserve: LABI 100 W
- Range: main: 18 nautical miles (33 km; 21 mi) reserve: 13 nautical miles (24 km; 15 mi)
- Characteristic: L Fl W 10s.
- Italy no.: 3010 E.F.

Capo Granitola Lighthouse (Italian: Faro di Capo Granitola) is an active lighthouse located on the south-western headland south of Mazzara del Vallo a region well known for its Almadraba. The tower is well placed in the nearby archeological park Cave di Cusa and is located in the municipality of Campobello di Mazara, Sicily on the Strait of Sicily.

== Description ==
The lighthouse, built in 1865, consists of a cylindrical tower, 35 metres (115 ft) high, with balcony and lantern rising from a 1-storey keeper's house. The tower, decorated with local stone, and the lantern are painted white; the lantern dome grey metallic. The lantern is positioned at 37 metres (121 ft) above sea level and emits one long white flash in a 10 seconds period visible up to a distance of 18 nautical miles (33 km; 21 mi). The lighthouse is completely automated and managed by the Marina Militare with the identification code number 3010 E.F.

== See also ==
- List of lighthouses in Italy
