= Propylon =

Monumental gateway in Ancient Greek architecture

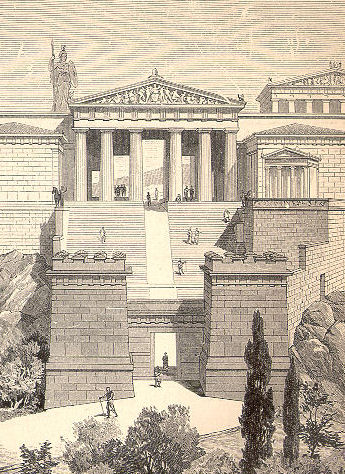
A 19th-century drawing of what the Propylaea in Athens might have looked like when intact

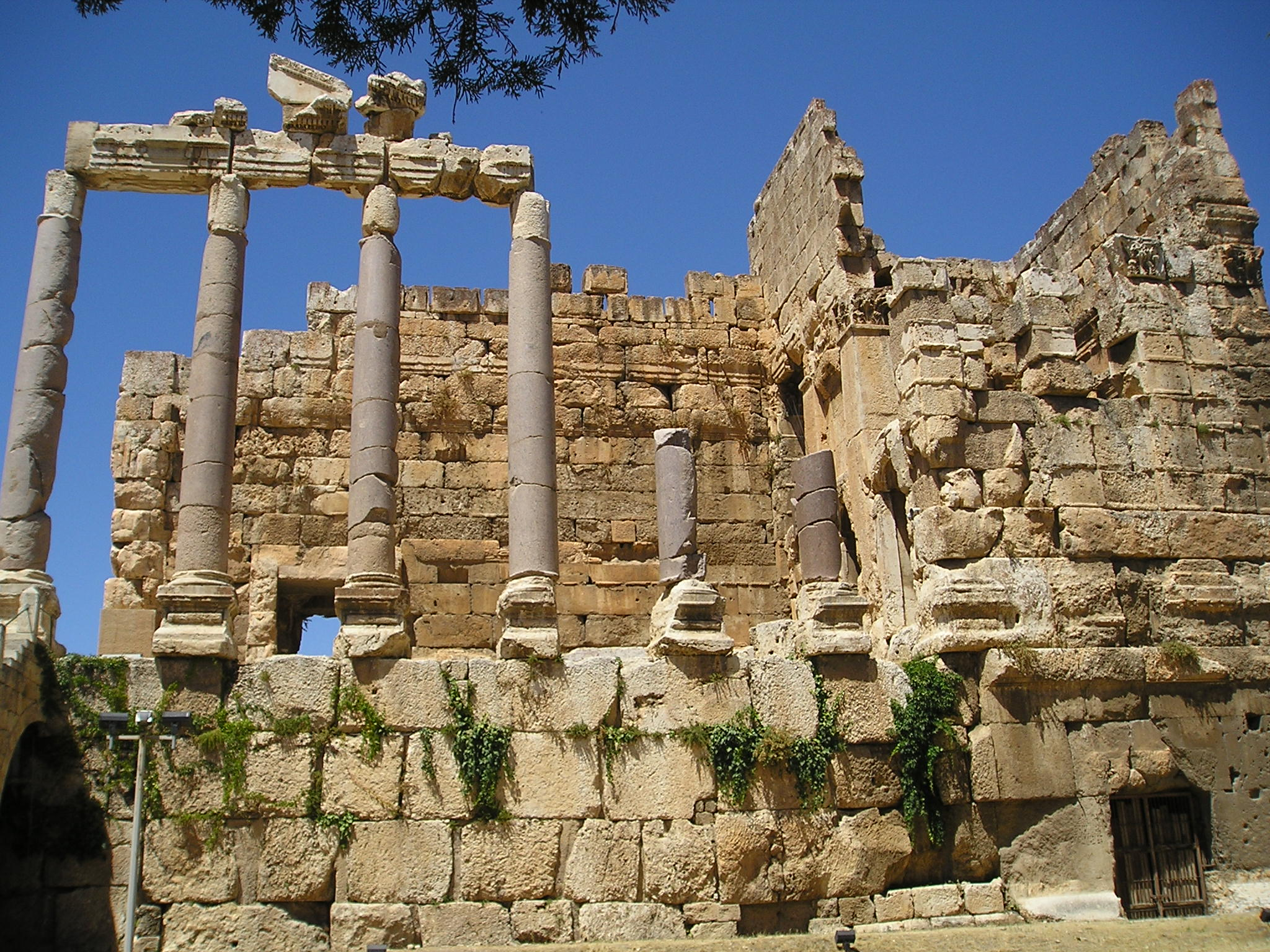
Propylaea of Baalbeck

In ancient Greek architecture, a propylon (/ˈprɒpɪlɒn/ or /ˈprɒupɪlɒn/; Ancient Greek πρόπυλον) is a monumental gateway, also referred to as a propylaeum (/prɒpɪˈliːəm/, a Latinized form of προπύλαιον), and often given in the plural as propyla or propylaea. It serves as a partition, separating the secular and religious parts of a city. The prototypical Greek example is the propylaea that served as the entrance to the Acropolis of Athens, which inspired Greek Revival architecture such as the Brandenburg Gate of Berlin and the Propylaea in Munich, which both evoke the central portion.

== Etymology ==
The Ancient Greek words πρόπυλον (própylon) and προπύλαιον (propýlaion) are composed of προ- (pro- 'before; in front of') + πύλη (púlē 'gate'), and originally meant 'that which is before the gate', but the word has come to mean simply 'gate building'. The latter was borrowed by Latin as propylaeum.

== Propylaea of the Athenian Acropolis ==
The propylaea were the monumental gates to the Acropolis, commissioned by the Athenian leader Pericles in order to rebuild the Acropolis at the conclusion of the Greco-Persian Wars. These propylaea were built wide enough to allow chariots through. The construction was part of Pericles' great rebuilding program for Athens in c. 437 BCE. The project of the Propylaea began once the Parthenon was almost done. It was overseen by the Athenian architect Mnesicles. Though the work was suspended due to the Peloponnesian War, the important pieces of Mnesicles' vision were able to come through. The architecture is unique in that the horizontal beams across the roof were supported by marble girders, which were supported by iron bars. The only other known use of metal in Greek architecture for structural purposes is the Temple of Zeus at Agrigento.

== Propyla outside the Greco-Roman world ==
The oldest known freestanding propylaeum is the one located at the palace area in Pasargadae, an Achaemenid capital.

A covered passage, called "the Propylaeum", used to face the Palace of Darius in Susa.

In the 18th century, the Athenian Propylaea inspired Carl Gotthard Langhans in construction of the Brandenburg Gate in Berlin.

== See also ==
- Portal (architecture)
- Triumphal arch
- Gate tower

== Bibliography ==
- Berve, H.; Gruben, G.; and Hirmer, M. Greek Temples, Theaters, and Shrines (New York, 1963). A general look at selected Greek structures.
- Dinsmoor, William Bell (1922), "Structural Iron in Greek Architecture", American Journal of Archaeology, XXVI.
- Dinsmoor, W. B., The Architecture of Ancient Greece (New York, 1975 – but actually a reprint of the 1950 publication). A general book on Greek architecture; dated in many areas but valuable for the Propylaea.
- Dinsmoor, W. B. Jr., The Propylaia I: The Predecessors (Princeton, 1980). A careful study of the predecessors of the Propylaea.
- Eiteljorg, Harrison, II, The Entrance to the Acropolis Before Mnesicles (Dubuque, 1993). A careful study of the predecessors of the Propylaea, with very different conclusions from those of Dinsmoor above.
- Lawrence, A. W., Greek Architecture (Baltimore, 1973). A general book on Greek architecture.
- Robertson, D.S. Greek and Roman Architecture' (Cambridge, 1969). A general book on Greek and Roman architecture. Available in paper, this may be the best place to begin for those with no knowledge of ancient architecture.
- Travlos, J., Pictorial Dictionary of Ancient Athens (London, 1971). An encyclopedic approach to the monuments of Athens.
- The Perseus Project. An electronic resource that provides quick information, but some of the information about the Propylaea was incorrect when the site was last checked. Several good photographs of the Propylaea are available through the Perseus project.
- Cartwright, Mark. "Propylaea". World History Encyclopedia, Https://Www.worldhistory.org#Organization, 24 July 2022, https://www.worldhistory.org/Propylaea/.
