= Kouros of Apollonas =

Unfinished marble statue in Naxos, Cycladic Islands

Coordinates: 37.179167°N 25.5476328°E

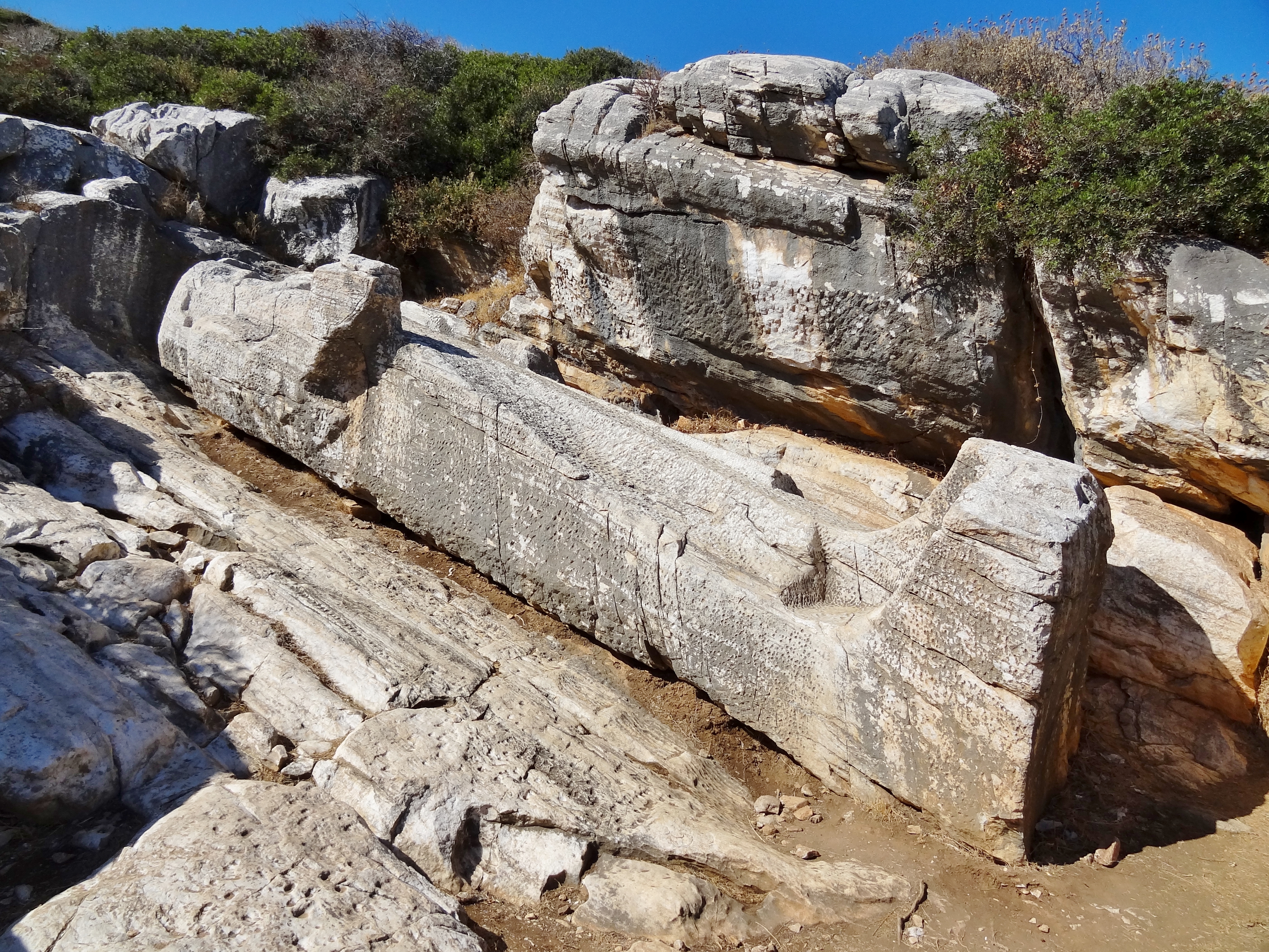
Kouros of Apollonas or Colossus of Dionysos

The Kouros of Apollonas, also called the Colossus of Dionysus, is a 10.7 metre tall unfinished statue of light grey Naxian marble with a weight of around 80 tonnes. It is located in an ancient quarry near Apollonas, a small town in the northern part of Naxos, one of the Cycladic Islands in the Aegean Sea. The statue is a kouros dating from Archaic period of Ancient Greece, around the turn of the seventh and sixth centuries BC.

== Name ==
The statue was formerly considered to be a statue of Apollo since it was located near the town of Apollonas. Bondelmonte called it a "statue Apollonis" in the fifteenth century on account of the proximity of the sanctuary of Apollo. Ludwig Ross referred to it as a Statue of Apollo in 1840. The name stuck for a long time, although Wilhelm von Massow identified the statue as Dionysos in 1932. Today it is classified as a kouros.

The Kouros of Apollonas is also referred to sometimes as the Kouros of Naxos, but this is unclear, since there are two other large kouroi at Melanes.

== Description ==
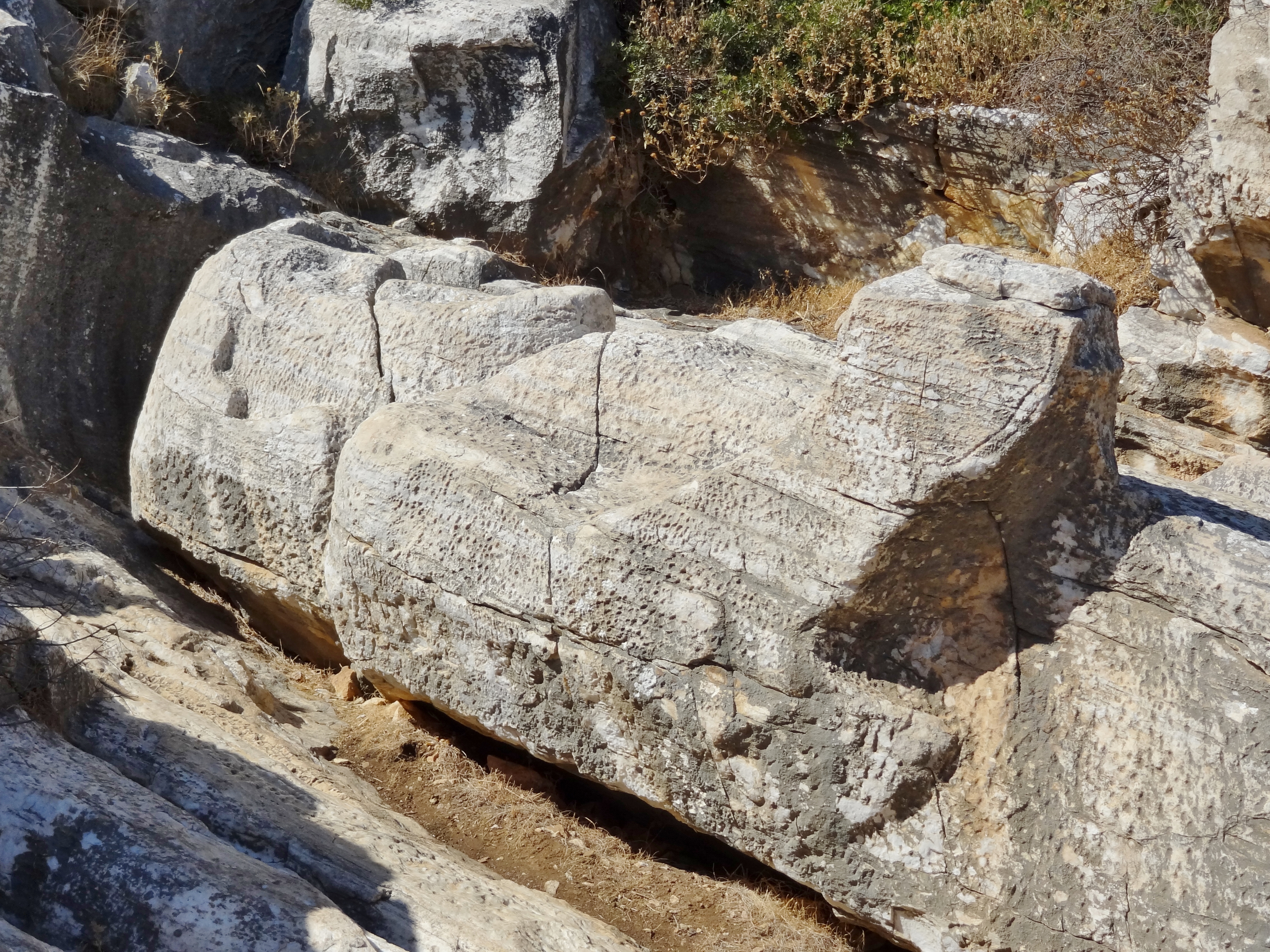
Head of the Kouros

The figure is roughly carved, but the body, head with beard and ears and the beginning of the hair are roughly recognisable. The arms have been cut by the stonemasons as rudimentary rectangles and the shaping of the feet had been begun; they are located on a 50 cm high plinth. The unfinished kouros lies in a rough stone slope. The extent to which cracks in the kouros are contemporary with its construction cannot be determined. The cracks are already visible in a sketch of 1835 by Schaubert for a copper etching.

== Context ==
In most cases, kouros statues depict naked young men with their arms at their sides. It is clear however that the Kouros of Apollonas was to be a depiction of an older man with a beard and that its right arm would have been stretched out in front of it.

The archaic kouroi have usually been interpreted as depictions of Apollo. On account of its beard, the Kouros of Apollonas has instead been interpreted as the Greek god Dionysus.

Two more unfinished, over-life-size kouroi, cut free from their quarry but with their feet broken off, the Kouroi of Flerio are located at Melanes on Naxos in a village garden. One of these would have been a higher and the other a lower kouros, i.e. one would have stood 5.5 metres high without a plinth and the other would have stood the same height with a plinth. From the same marble quarry at Melanes came the roughly 9 metre high 25 ton Colossus of the Naxians, which was completed and set up on the island of Delos but is now in fragments.

There are also two smaller unfinished kouroi on Naxos. One was located in the quarry of Apollonas until Ludwig Ross transferred it to the Museum at Athens in 1834. The other came from Flerio and is located in the Museum of Naxos on a terrace.

== Creation ==
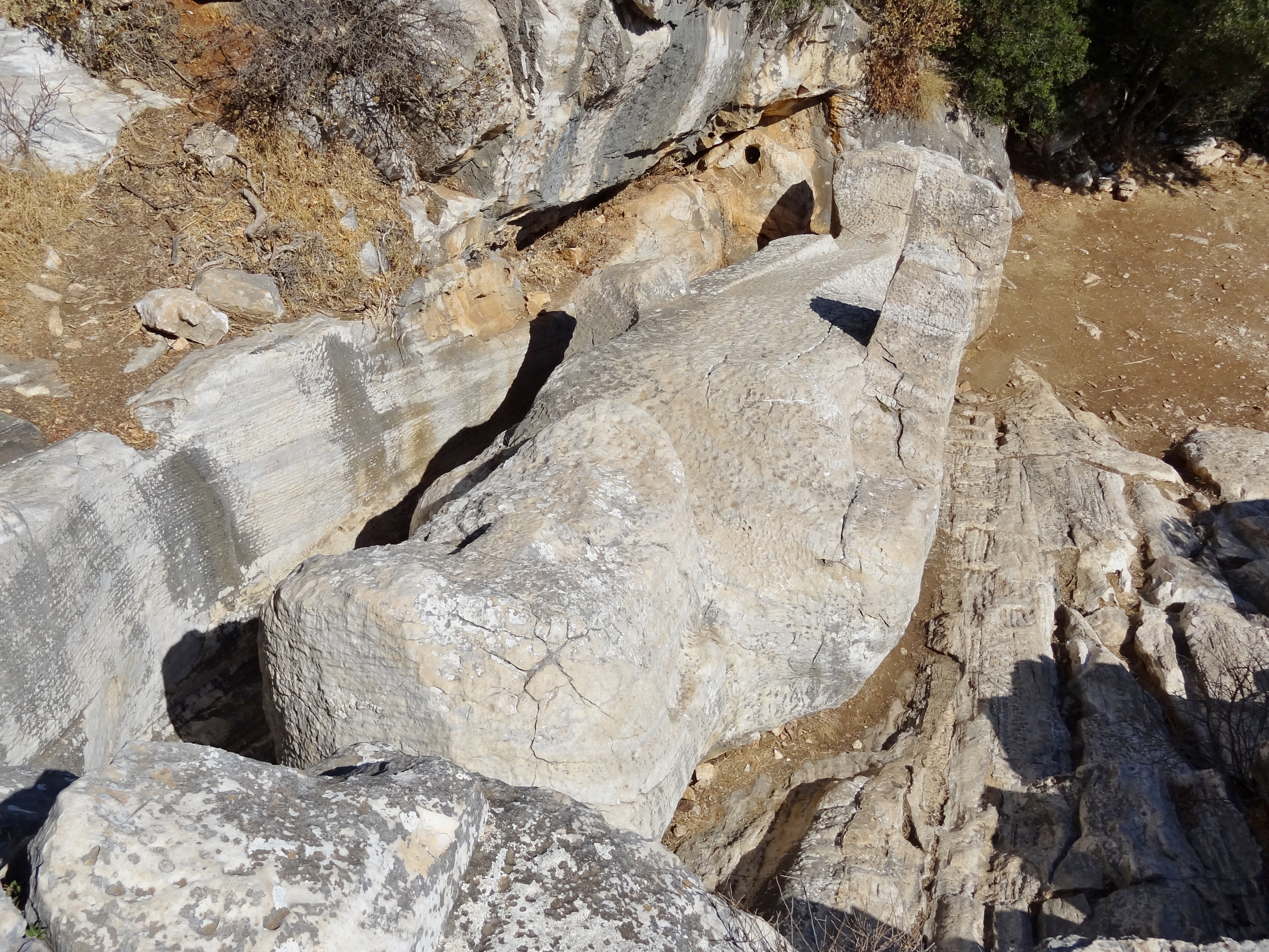
View from the head end

According to Carl Blümel, a sculptor and director of the Pergamon Museum, Greek quarrying in early times was similar to Egyptian quarrying practice. The rough form of the figure was carved out. The sculptors were especially able to work the sides. They worked layer by layer, creating flat contour areas. So the sculptors never worked on a leg, arm or head individually, but always on the sculpture as a whole and thus the whole figure was at the same stage of completion at each moment. Only after the creation of the rough contour was the figure rounded out. This is all clearly demonstrated by the Kouros of Apollonas.

The sculptors used bronze chisels, which have left numerous holes in the sculpture, which were probably also the result of the use of pickaxes and hammers and would have been smoothed out in the course of the work by the use of finer chisels and gentler blows. By smashing the crystal grains of the marble, this work created a smooth surface at the finishing stages.

== Quarry ==
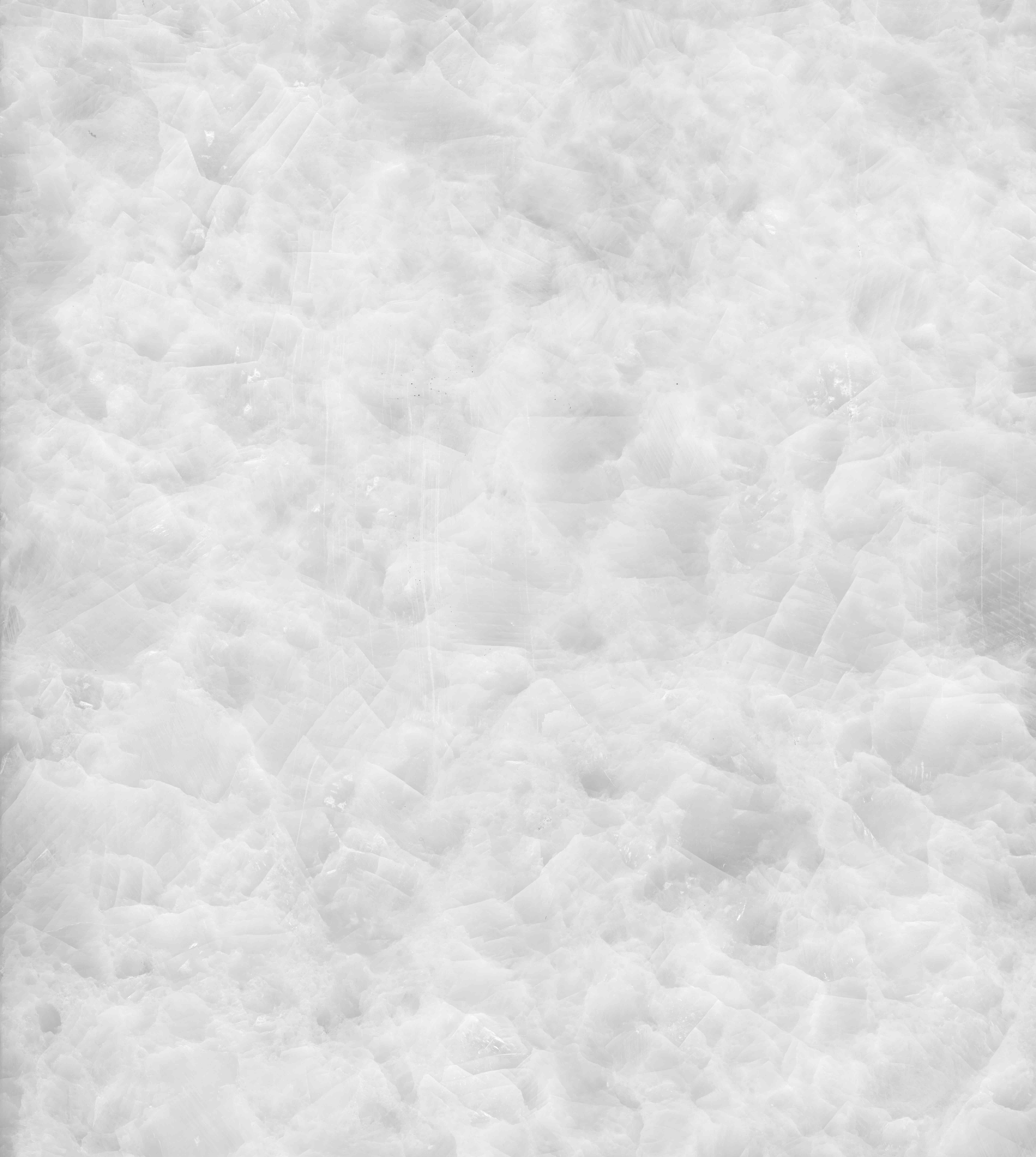
Pattern of the large-grained, light grey to blue Naxian marble of the "Alexander" type from Kinidaros

The Kouros of Apollonas is located in an ancient marble quarry which is one of the oldest quarries in Greece. It lies not far from Apollonas on an unpaved road above the village. It is a typical surface quarry, of the sort from which stone objects were cut straight out of the cliff face or ground surface.

== Transport ==
The statue, which has an estimated weight of about 80 tonnes, had been cut free from the stone on three sides, but it was not completed. On the back of the Kouros there are 5–8 cm wide keyholes, which are between 32 and 37 cm apart. In the centre, between the back of the kouros and the stone is a rectangular hole with a width of 40 cm, for the insertion of a wooden lifting beam. These recesses are located in the main lifting points of Greek monoliths. This ancient quarrying technique can be detected by traces in numerous places in the quarry, since it was not used in later times. The figure lies on a north–south orientation on an incline of about 30°. On the east side it was 19 cm above ground level and about 32 cm below it on the north side.

The sculptors got no further in their plans to transport this kouros, since a route for the further transport of the statue was never carved into the stone. On account of its size and weight, the figure remained unfinished in the quarry. Other reasons for the statue remaining unfinished are mentioned in tourist guidebooks and websites. These cannot be demonstrated. There is a claim that it was realised late in the production process that the statue had several cracks, or it is assumed that the ancient sculptors thought it might break during the process of cutting it out of the ground, or that the sculpture was not paid for. The view of the archaeologist, Gruben, that the monolith was too heavy to transport is undisputed in academic works.

== Bibliography ==
- Carl Blümel. Griechische Bildhauer an der Arbeit. 2nd Edition. de Gruyter, Berlin 1941.
- Marion Meyer, Nora Brüggemann. Kore und Kouros. Weihegaben für die Götter. Phoibos Verlag, Wien 2007, ISBN 978-3-901232-80-0 (Wiener Forschungen zur Archäologie 10).
- Gottfried Gruben. "Naxos und Delos." Jahrbuch des Deutschen Archäologischen Instituts 112, 1997 (1998), ISBN 3-11-015369-6, p. 262 ff. Accessible online.
