= Colossus of the Naxians =

Naxian marble statue

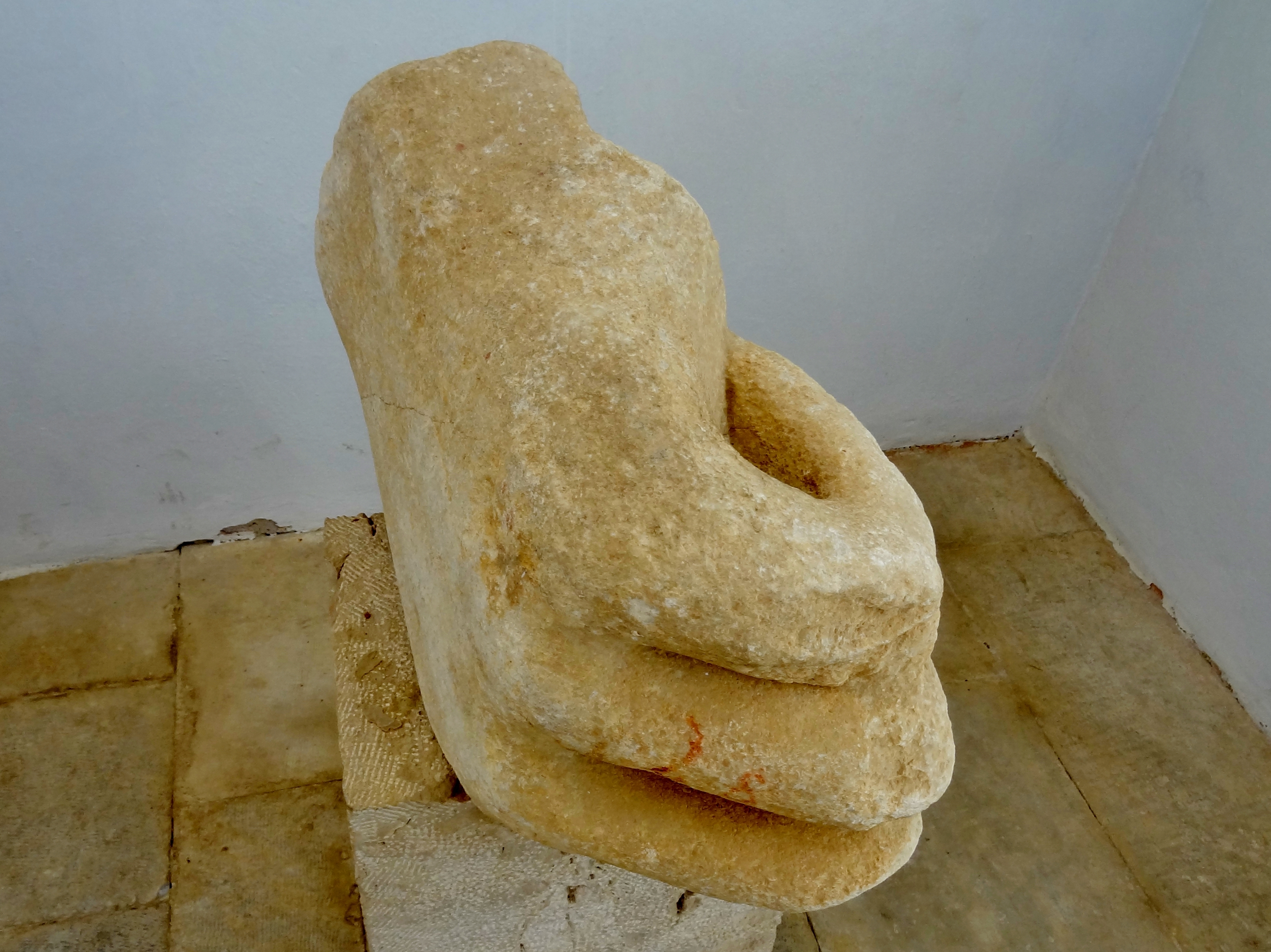
Left hand of the Colossus of the Naxians

The Colossus of the Naxians is a kouros statue made of Naxian marble which was about 9 metres high, now located in the Museum on Delos and originally from one of the islands of the Cyclades. The colossus is an example of archaic monumental sculpture and dates to the end of the seventh century BC. The colossus is one of the largest kouros statues yet known. Only the Kouros of Apollonas, which remains unfinished in the quarry at Apollonas, is larger at 10.7 m tall. The Colossus of the Naxians is now broken into many pieces.

== Statue ==
An inscription on the front of the base reported by Cyriacus of Ancona in the fifteenth century read "ΝΑΞΙΟΙ ΑΠΟΛΛΩΝΙ" (Naxioi Apolloni, "The Naxians (dedicated this) to Apollo"), so the marble sculpture is probably of Apollo.

=== Description ===
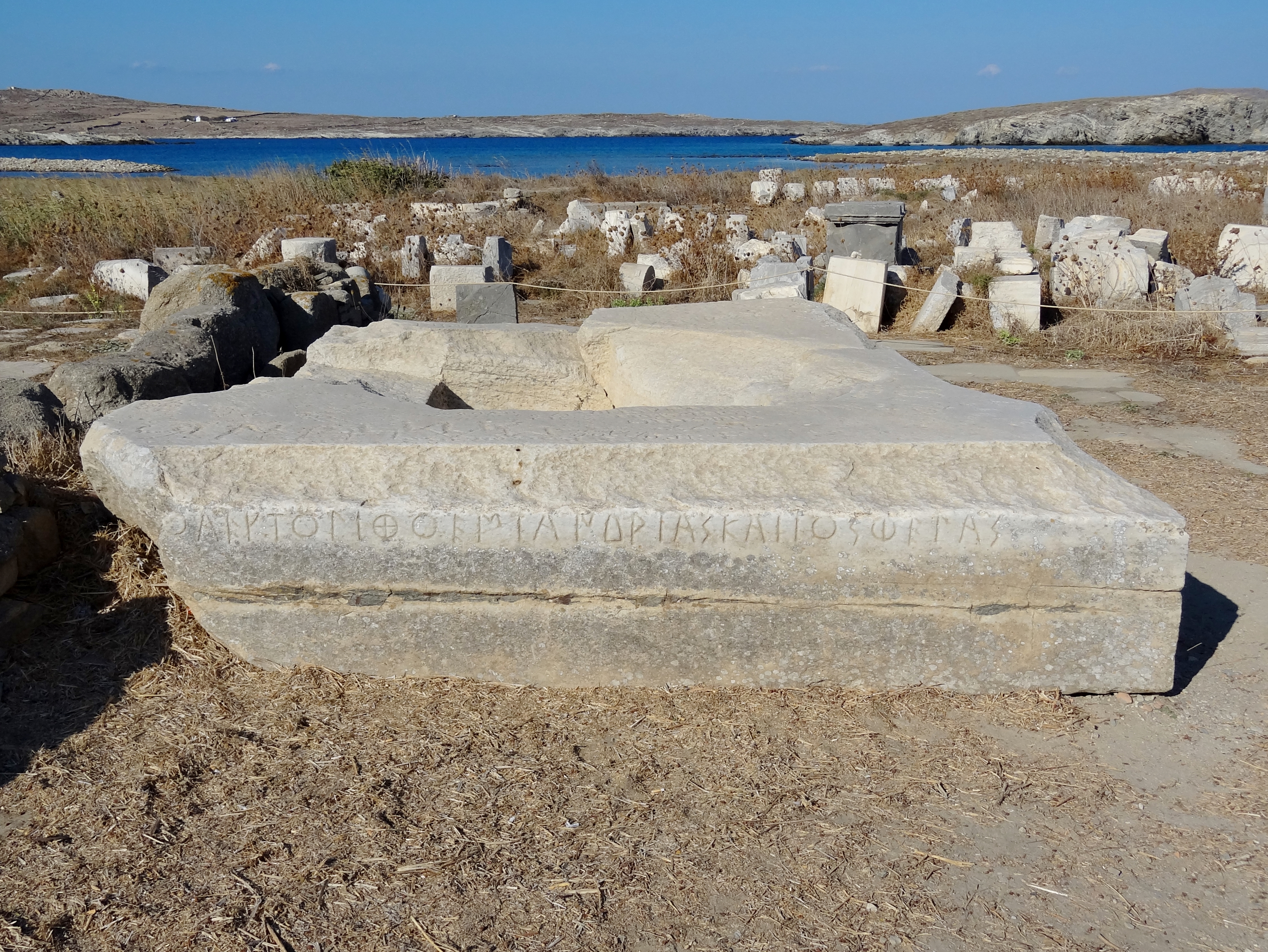
Base of the Colossus of the Naxians

The statue is broken into several parts. The base measures 3.48 x 5.08 metres, the upper torso is about 2.3 metres high and the lower torso is about 1.15 metres. The left foot, which is now kept in the British Museum is 0.57 metres long. There was a hole in the left hand to allow it to hold a bow. The head and the upper legs have been lost.

On the upper side of the lower torso there was a 20–30 cm wide bronze belt, which may have been discerned from the series of pinholes in the marble. On the sides of the upper torso, about 40 cm above the belt are holes into which the arms were fastened. On the neck are traces of ringlets. On the back of the base is an inscription which reads "[τ]ο̑ ἀϝυτο̑ λίθο̄ ε̄̓μὶ ἀνδριὰς καὶ τὸ σφέλας" (to awuto litho emi andrias kai to sphelas, "I am the same stone – both statue and base").

=== Transport and erection ===
The colossus originated at a marble quarry near Melanes on the Cycladian island of Naxos. It was not carved there, except for the most basic shaping and was transported to the port of Naxos, about ten kilometres away. The figure, which weighs about 30 tonnes, was then transported by ship to Delos. There were ships which could transport more than 40 tonnes, but the load was difficult to transport. Therefore, it has been suggested that the half-worked colossus was transported by two ships yoked together.

For the erection of the Colossus, a scaffold about 11 metres high would have been erected in order to pull it upright with pulleys and ropes. The statue stood in a prominent place, so that it could be seen from a distance and was taller than all known buildings on the island at the time. The statue would have had a weight of about 25 tonnes at this point; final details of the statue were only added after the statue had been set up.

== See also ==
- List of ancient Greek and Roman monoliths

== Bibliography ==
- Carl Blümel. Griechische Bildhauer an der Arbeit. 2nd Edition. Berlin 1941.
- Gottfried Gruben. "Naxos und Delos." pp. 261–416. In: Jahrbuch des Deutschen Archäologischen Instituts 1998. Edited by the Deutsche Archäologische Institut. Walter De Gruyter. Berlin 1998, ISBN 3-11-015369-6 (partially accessible online).
- Luca Giuliani: "Der Koloss der Naxier." In Luca Giuliani (ed.): Meisterwerke der antiken Kunst. C. H. Beck Verlag, München 2005. ISBN 3-406-53094-X ( partially accessible online).
