= Campobello di Mazara =

Campobello di Mazara Campubbeḍḍu (Sicilian)
- Comune
- Comune di Campobello di Mazara
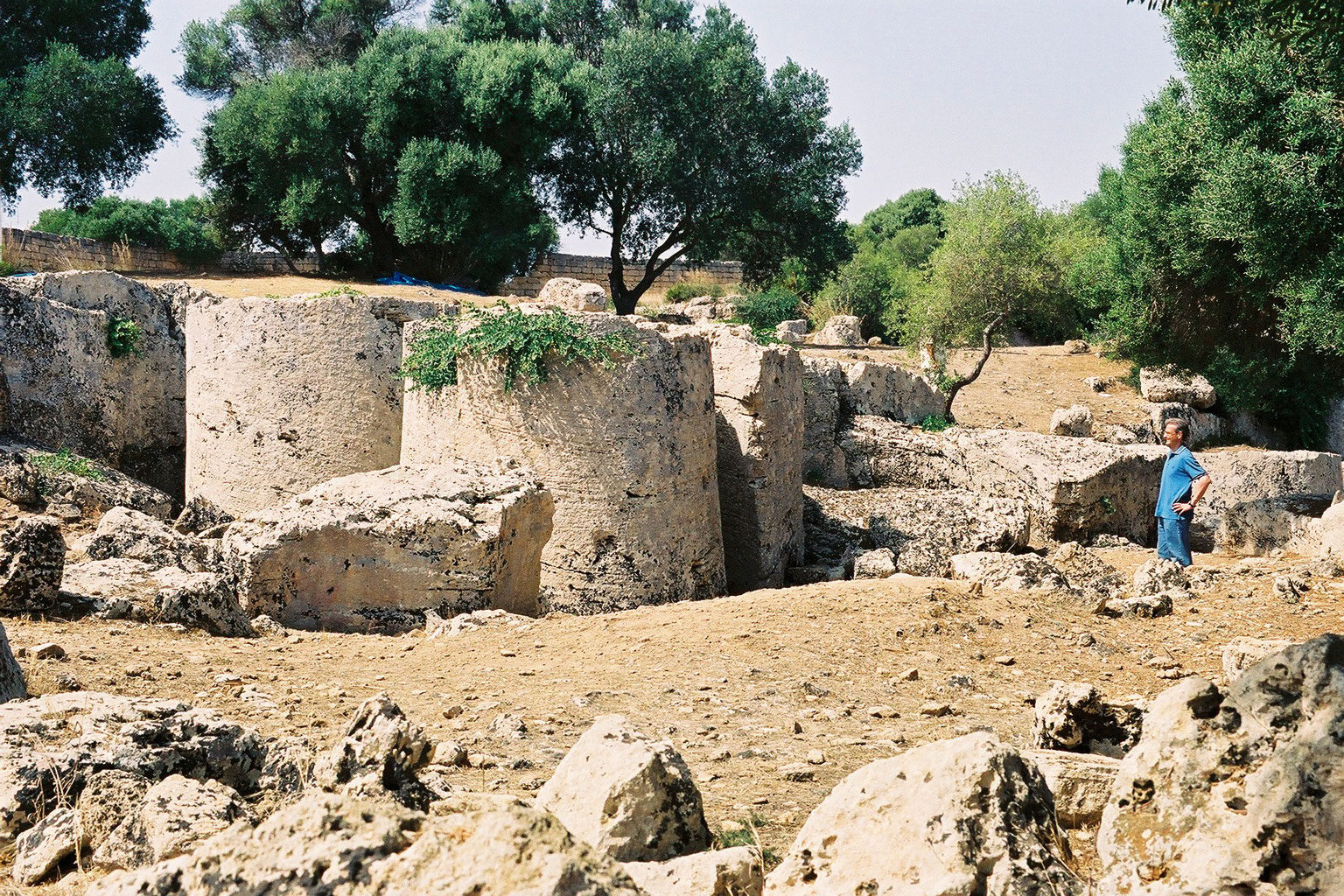
- Rocks of Cusa

- Location within Italy Location within Sicily
- Coordinates: 37°38′N 12°45′E
- Country: Italy
- Region: Sicily
- Province: Trapani (TP)
- Frazioni: Tre Fontane, Torretta Granitola

Government
  - Mayor: Giuseppe Castiglione

Area
  - Total: 65.83 km^{2} (25.42 sq mi)
- Elevation: 110 m (360 ft)

Population (30 June 2022)
  - Total: 11,341
  - Density: 172.3/km^{2} (446.2/sq mi)
- Demonym: Campobellesi
- Time zone: UTC+1 (CET)
  - Summer (DST): UTC+2 (CEST)
- Postal code: 91021
- Dialing code: 0924
- Patron saint: St. Vitus
- Saint day: June 15
- Website: Official website

Campobello di Mazara (Sicilian: Campubbeḍḍu) is a town in the province of Trapani, Sicily, southern Italy.

Its inhabitants are scattered in the town center and the minor seaside frazioni of Tre Fontane and Torretta Granitola, populated mostly during the summer period. It borders on the neighbouring cities of Mazara del Vallo and Castelvetrano, and is colloquially known just as Campobello.

== History ==
Campus Belli is the name the Romans gave to the site of the battle between Segesta and Selinunte; the name later extended to the town.

Near the town lies Rocche di Cusa, the ancient quarries from which the Selinuntines extracted stone to build temples.

Campobello di Mazara was founded in 1623 by Giuseppe di Napoli, who in 1630 was given it as a dukedom.

In January 2023 it was revealed that the Mafia most-wanted boss Matteo Messina Denaro was living in the city at the time of his arrest, on January 16.

== Main sights ==
- Cave di Cusa
- Ducal Palace
- The Clocktower. About 27 m high, it overlooks the town.
- Mother Church of Santa Maria delle Grazie
- Palazzo Accardi

== Economy ==
The town is an agricultural center and is known thanks to its production of olives and wine plantations.

Cultivated fields, mainly olive groves and vines, characterize the landscape of Campobello di Mazara.
