= Cave di Cusa =

Ancient stone quarry in Sicily, Italy

- Rocche di Cusa
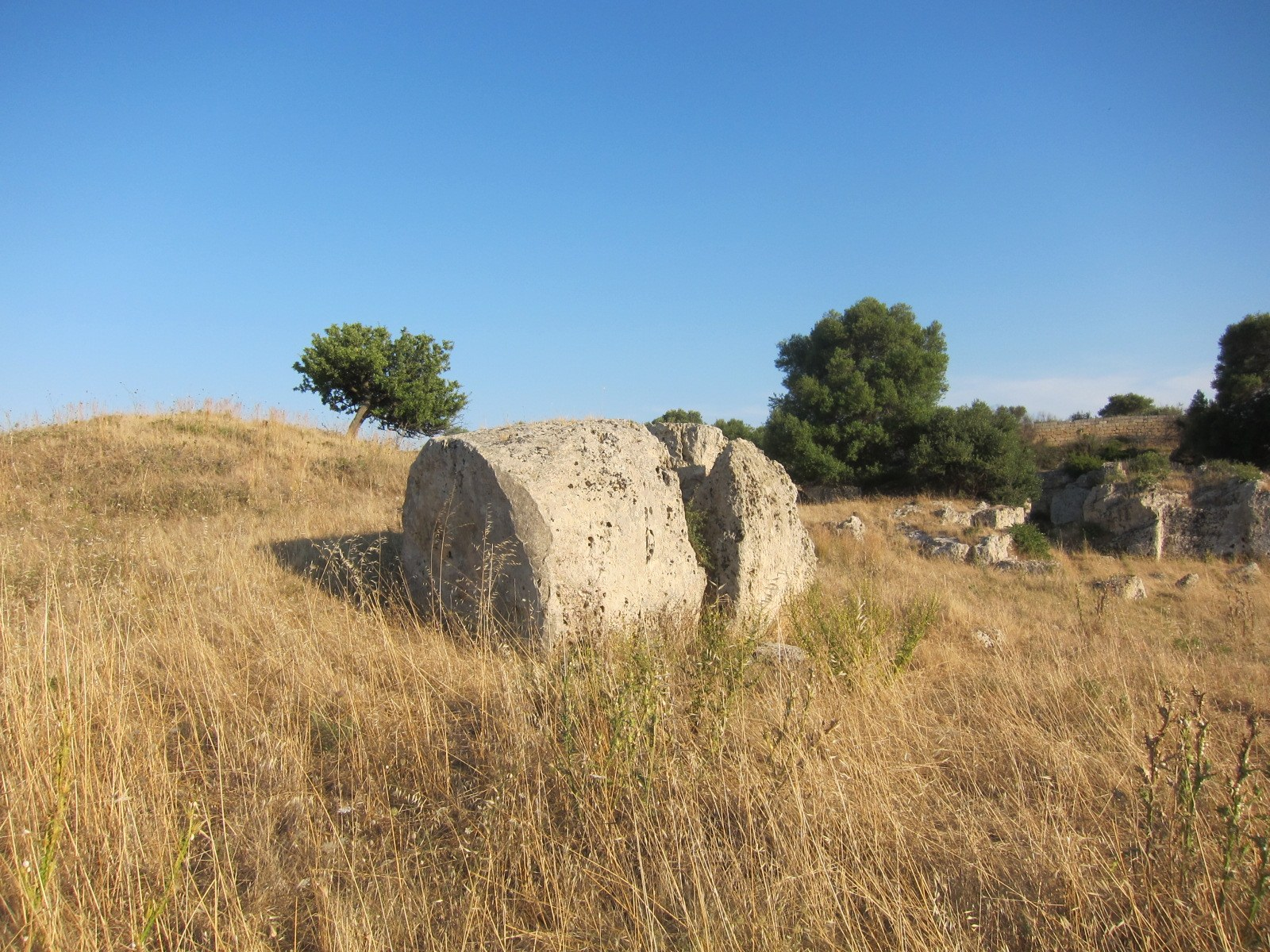
- Drum for a temple column in Cave di Cusa

- Location within Italy
- 37°37′10″N 12°43′21″E
- Type: Quarry
- Periods: Archaic Greek to Classical Greek
- Cultures: Greek
- Satellite of: Selinunte
- Location: Campobello di Mazara, Province of Trapani, Sicily, Italy

History
- Built: 559 BC
- Abandoned: 409 BC

Site notes
- Length: 1.8 km (1.1 mi)
- Condition: Ruined
- Owner: Public
- Management: Soprintendenza BB.CC.AA. di Trapani
- Public access: Yes
- Website: Area Archeologica Cave di Cusa Vincenzo Tusa (in Italian)

Cave di Cusa or Rocche di Cusa was an ancient stone quarry in Sicily, Italy. It is located 3 kilometers south of the town Campobello di Mazara in the province of Trapani, Italy. It is 1.8 kilometer long and is on a ridge that spans from east to west. This site was quarried beginning in the first half of the 6th century BC and its stone was used to construct the temples in the ancient Greek city Selinunte. It was abandoned in 409 BC when the city was captured by the Carthaginians. It is now an official Sicilian Archeological Zone and a popular tourist site.

== History ==
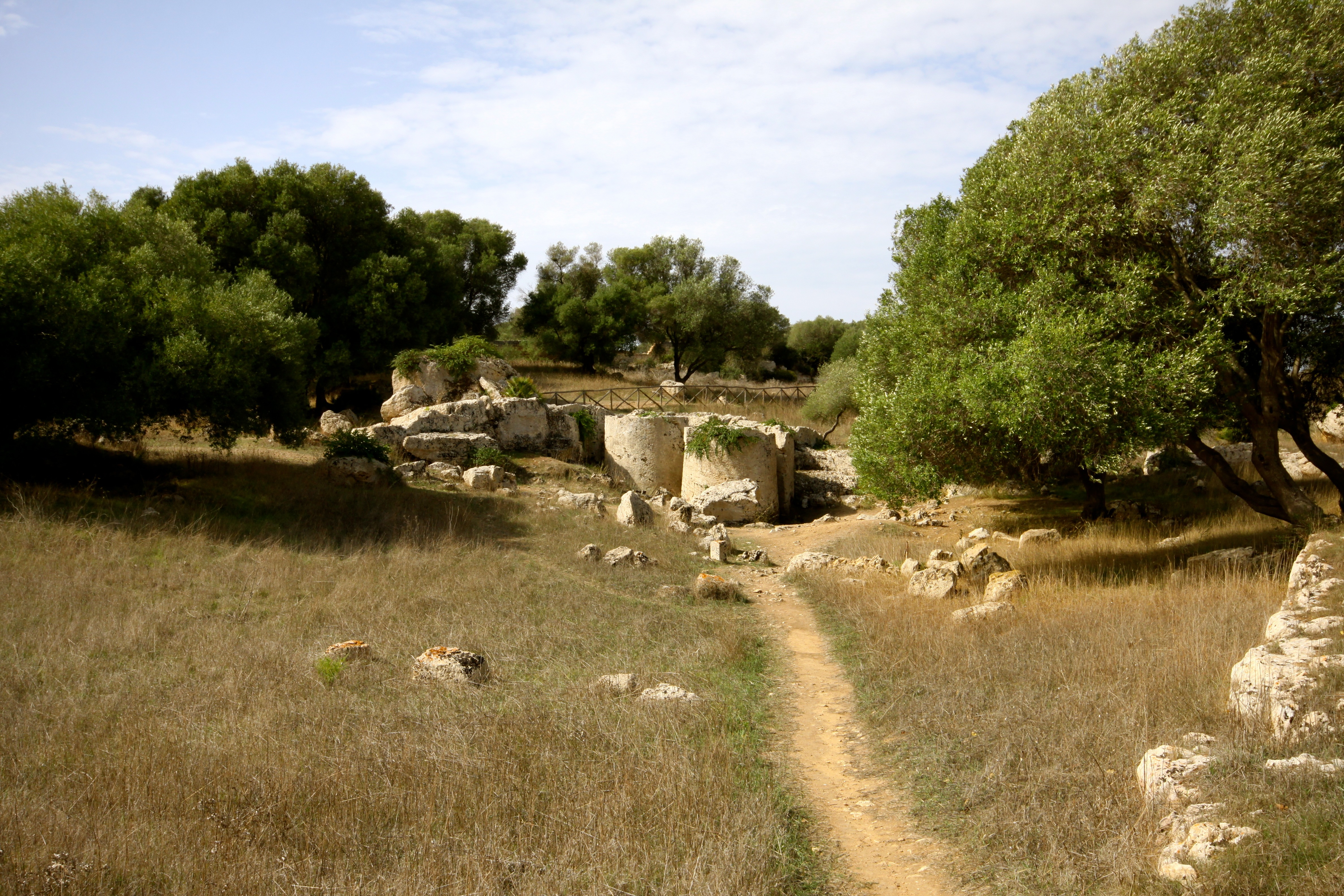
Raw columns for the unfinished Temple G of Selinunte

Cave di Cusa was the source of stone used to build the town of Selinunte's sacred temple. Selinunte was a Greek temple that was located 13 km southwest from the quarry. That area of Sicily was inhabited mainly by the ancient Greeks. The stone found at Cave di Cusa site was very suitable for building and therefore a material of choice. Its texture and tufa (resistant limestone) material made it suitable for the construction of the local Greek temple. This quarry was mined for about 150 years. There is evidence to believe that at one time, 150 people worked there. Many of them were slave laborers.

In 409 BC Cave di Cusa was suddenly abandoned due to the arrival of Carthaginian invader Hannibal Mago. This visit broke out into a war, and ultimately Selinunte was defeated. The town was destroyed after the defeat, and no work occurred at the quarry again. The slaves and laborers fled the scene and escaped to safety. The blocks of stone that were being worked on were abandoned and remain at the site. In its day, Cave di Cusa was very efficient.

== Archaeological investigation ==
Archaeological investigation on the site has given us a lot of information regarding Cave di Cusa and how it was used. The site itself is covered in 60 blocks of rock, many of them cylindrical in nature, in various stages of carving, strewn haphazardly around the site (some in situ) that were originally intended for the construction of the temple. The stone from this site was used for columns at the temple, and many columns still exist at the site today. The rock is in different stages of being quarried, so it is evident that the abandonment of the site occurred rather quickly. There is evidence of pick marks on the rocks from various stone tools, so archaeologists have been able to determine the methods used to quarry the stone. Many efficient and advanced methods were used to carve the stone, like grooves and holes put on "architraves" that allowed ropes and beams to be threaded through them to aid in lifting the rock. It shows how crafty and intelligent ancient peoples were in working on this site.

== Tourism ==
In modern times, Cave di Cusa has become a popular tourist destination. The ancient Greek culture and influence of Selinunte and the surrounding areas is evidenced here. It is said to be beautiful in the spring, due to its array of flowers and pillars. There are also many bed and breakfasts located nearby, due to the large amount of tourism. In addition, it has historical and cultural value. The pillar components are well preserved and as their production was interrupted, visitors may find the site educational as well as beautiful.
