= Temple of Olympian Zeus, Agrigento =

Doric temple in Sicily, Italy

Temple of Olympian Zeus
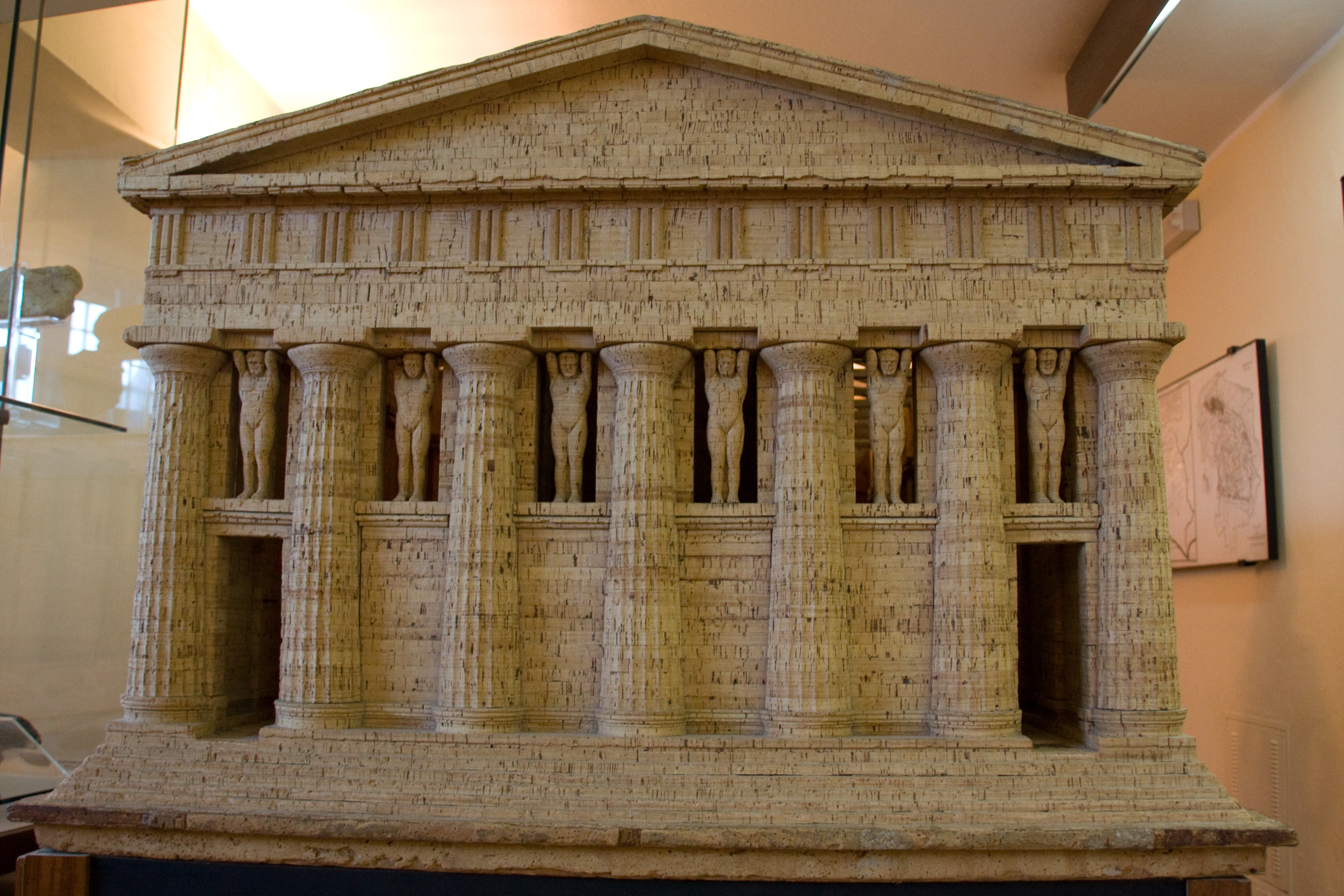
- Model of the Temple of Olympian Zeus in the Archaeological Museum, Agrigento
- Interactive map of the Temple of Olympian Zeus area

General information
- Architectural style: Doric
- Location: Agrigento, Sicily
- Coordinates: 37°17′27″N 13°35′4″E
- Construction started: 480 BC ?

Technical details
- Size: Length : 112.70 metres (370 ft); Width : 56.30 metres (185 ft); Height : 20 metres (66 ft)

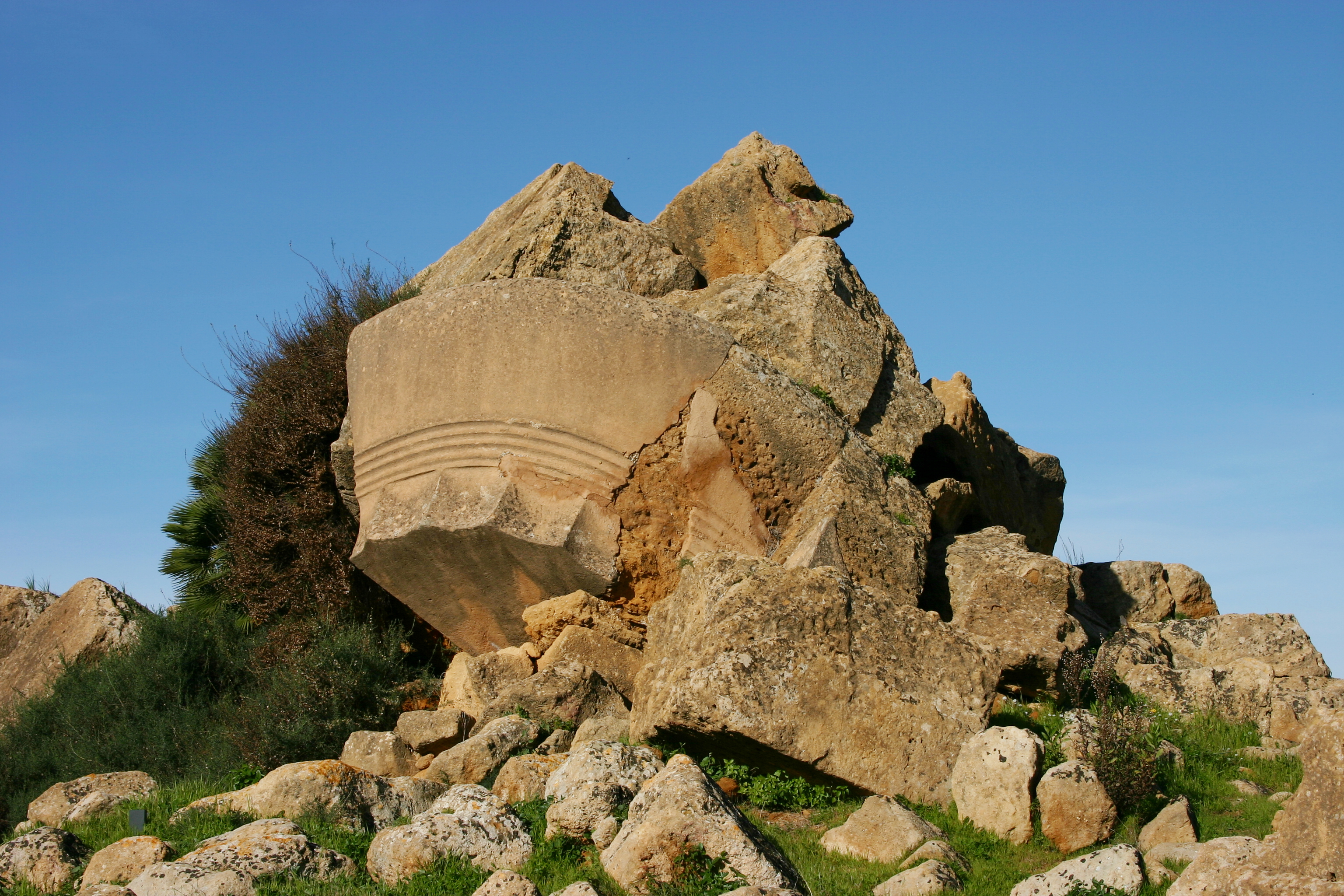
Remains of the Temple of Olympian Zeus

The Temple of Olympian Zeus (or Olympeion; known in Italian as the Tempio di Giove Olimpico) in Agrigento, Sicily was the largest Doric temple ever constructed, although it was never completed and now lies in ruins. It stands in the Valle dei Templi with a number of other major Greek temples.

== History ==
The history of the temple is unclear, but it was probably founded to commemorate the Battle of Himera (480 BC), in which the Greek cities of Akragas (Agrigento) and Syracuse, Magna Graecia, defeated the Carthaginians under Hamilcar. According to the historian Diodorus Siculus, the temple was built using Carthaginian slave labour – presumably defeated soldiers captured after the battle. It is otherwise little mentioned in ancient literature. The Greek historian Polybius mentions it briefly in a 2nd-century BC description of Akragas, commenting that "the other temples and porticoes which adorn the city are of great magnificence, the temple of Olympian Zeus being unfinished but second it seems to none in Greece in design and dimensions."

According to Diodorus, it remained unfinished due to the Carthaginian conquest of the city in 406 BC, with the Siege of Akragas. The temple's roof was already missing at this time. The temple was eventually toppled by earthquakes and in the 18th century was quarried extensively to provide building materials for the modern towns of Agrigento and nearby Porto Empedocle. Today it survives only as a broad stone platform heaped with tumbled pillars and blocks of stone.

== Architecture ==
The temple, whose structure is still under debate, measured 112.7 x 56.3 m at the stylobate, with a height of some 20 m. The whole construction was made of small stone blocks, which has led to uncertainty to the total size of the building. According to Diodorus, the columns' grooves could easily house a man; their height has been estimated from 14.5 to 19.2 meters. Each stood on a five-stepped platform approximately 4.5 m above the ground. The enclosure occupied a large basement with a five-step crepidoma. The front of the temple had seven semi-columns, an archaic feature that precluded the addition of a central door. The long sides had fourteen semi-columns.

Unlike other temples of the time, the outer columns did not stand on their own as a freestanding peristyle but were engaged against a continuous curtain wall needed to support the immense weight of its entablature. In between the columns were colossal atlases, stone figures standing some 7.5 m high. The figures appear to have alternated between bearded and clean-shaven figures, all nude and standing with their backs to the wall and hands stretched above their heads.

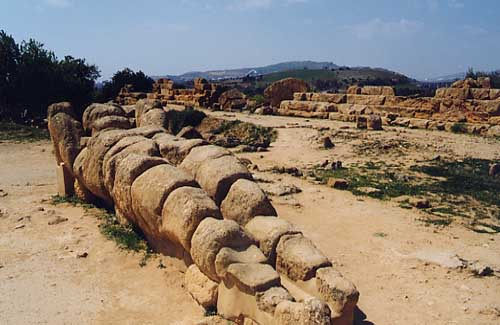
Remains of one atlas in the Olympieion field

The exact positioning of the atlases has been the subject of some archaeological debate, but it is generally believed that they stood on a recessed ledge on the upper part of the outer wall, bearing the weight of the upper portion of the temple on their upheld hands. One of the fallen atlases has been assembled in the nearby archaeological museum and a replica can be seen on the ground among the ruins of the temple. Attempts to make a detailed reconstruction of the atlases' original appearance have been hampered by their poor condition; they are heavily eroded and all of their feet appear to be missing.

The atlases are an exceptionally unusual feature, and may possibly have been unique in their time. They have been interpreted by some as symbolising the Greek enslavement of the Carthaginian invaders, or have even been attributed to Egyptian influences. Joseph Rykwert comments that "the sheer size of the temple seems to confirm the reputed extravagance of the Akragans, their love of display."

The presence of windows between the columns is not confirmed. The cell was formed by a wall connecting twelve pilasters on each long side, the angular ones enclosing the pronaos and the episthodomos. The entrance to the cella was provided by an unknown number of doors. The interior was inspired by Phoenician-Carthaginian architecture: it comprised an immense triple-aisled hall of pillars, the middle of which was open to the sky. The roof was probably never completed, though the pediments had a full complement of marble sculptures. The eastern end, according to Diodorus Siculus' enthusiast description, displayed a Gigantomachy, while the western end depicted the fall of Troy, again symbolising the Greeks' triumph over their barbarian rivals.

In front of the eastern façade is the pilastered basement of the huge high altar, measuring 54,50 x 17,50 m.

== See also ==
- List of Ancient Greek temples
- List of Greco-Roman roofs
