= Temple of Apollo (Naxos) =

Ancient Greek temple on Naxos, Greece

Temple of Apollo (Portara)
- Ναός του Απόλλωνα (Πορτάρα) (Greek)
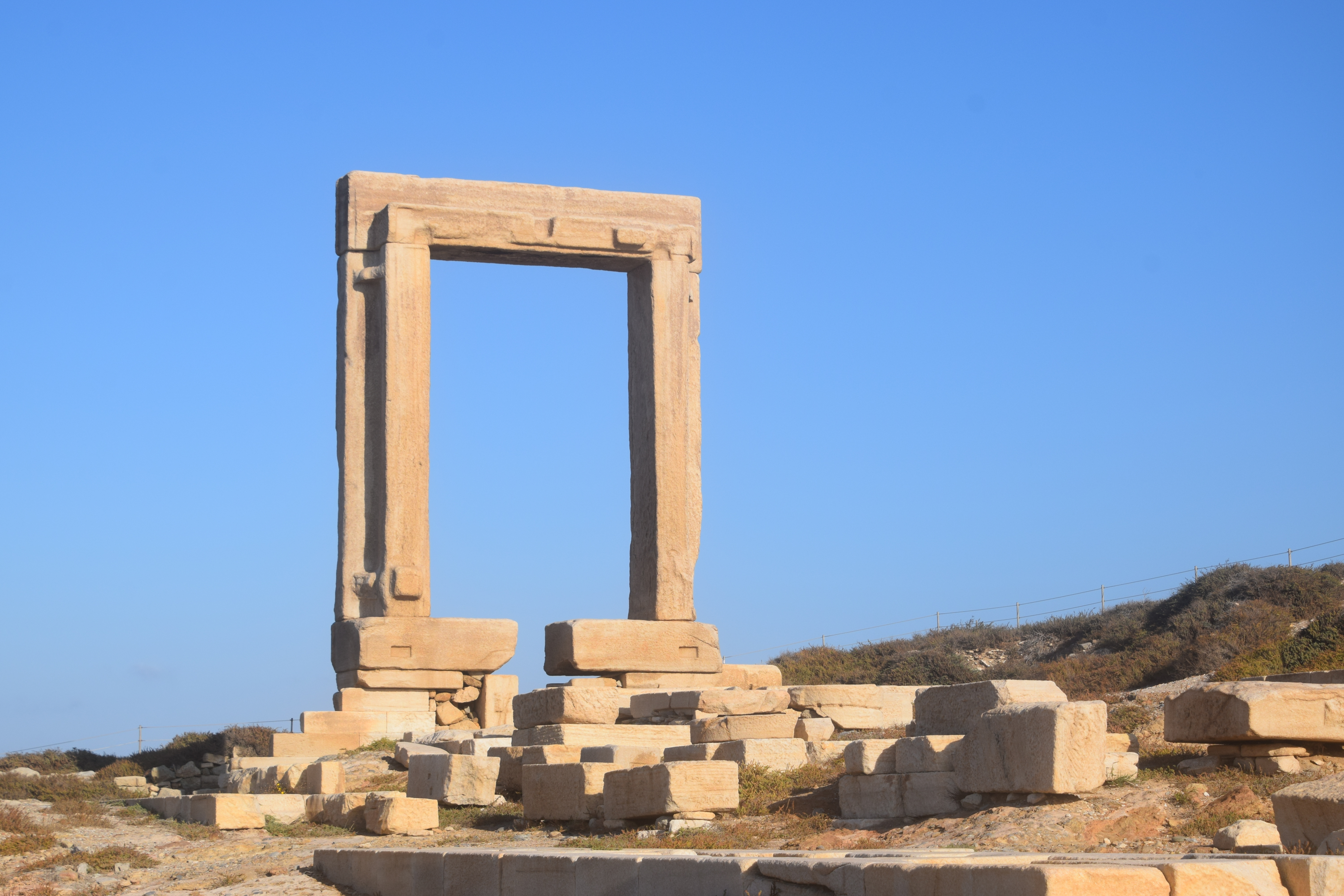
- View of the temple from the south

- Location within Greece
- 37.1102°N 25.3723°E
- Type: Temple
- Periods: Archaic Greek
- Location: Naxos (city), Greece

History
- Built: c. 530 BC
- Built by: Lygdamis

Site notes
- Material: Naxian marble
- Height: 6 m (20 ft)
- Length: 38 m (125 ft)
- Width: 16 m (52 ft)
- Architectural style: Ionic
- Condition: Ruined
- Owner: Public
- Public access: Yes

The Temple of Apollo, or Portara (Greek: Πορτάρα, meaning 'large door'), was an ancient Greek temple in Naxos, dedicated to the god Apollo. The temple was constructed in the 6th century BC by the tyrant Lygdamis.

It is located on the islet Palatia at the northern end of Naxos' harbor. This islet is commonly thought to correspond to the place where, in Greek Mythology, Theseus abandoned Ariadne, who was then abducted by Dionysus and his entourage. The islet is connected to the town of Naxos by a causeway built in 1919.

== History ==
=== Prehistory and early history ===
During prehistory, the islet was connected by a narrow isthmus to the rest of the island and is believed to have been fortified. A sanctuary dedicated to Apollo is thought to have existed there since at least the 8th century BC. During the 7th century BC, the islet was captured and used as a base for assaults against Naxos by Miletus and Erythrae.

=== Construction ===
Construction of the temple was started around 530 BC by the tyrant Lygdamis, whose building program included several public buildings and infrastructure projects on the island. The temple was of ionic order, 38 meters long and 16 meters wide, with an entrance on the northwest side. It is oriented towards the sacred island of Delos. Construction work stopped at the latest around 524 BC, when Lygdamis was removed from power by the Peloponnesian League, a military alliance led by Sparta, and the temple remained unfinished.

The main surviving feature of the temple is its large marble door frame. It consists of five marble pieces (originally four), weighing up to 20 tons each. The marble was transported there from the marble quarry at Flerio, about 10 km (6.2 mi) away. There is a number of bosses (bumps) carved on the marble pieces, which were used to hold ropes in order to lift the pieces by wooden crane. These would normally be removed at the end of construction, which shows that the temple was never completed. The temple had two planning phases: some initial construction had taken place in the 540s BC, however at some point around 530 BC the temple plan was changed and rotated by 180 degrees.

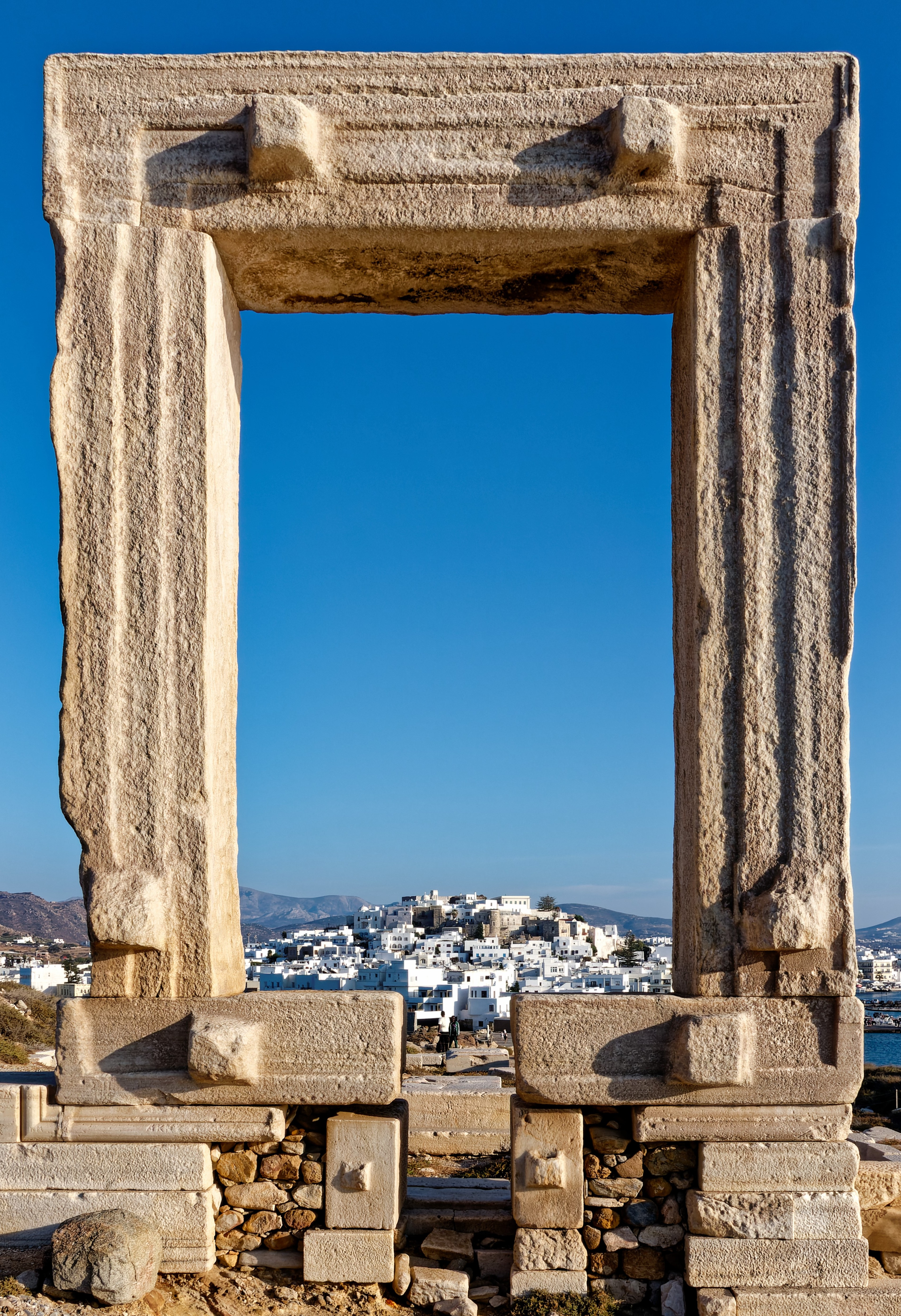
View of the gate from the north

=== Later history ===
Much later, during the 5th century AD, a Christian church was built on top of the ancient temple ruins. This church, which was dedicated to Saint Mary, was known as Panagia Palatiani. A cut, still visible today, was made in the Portara's threshold to make room for the door of that church. During the 9th century AD, a church dedicated to Saints Nicholas and Constantine was added. During the Venetian Period, many parts of the temple were reused for the construction of the Castle of Naxos. The massive marble pieces of the temple's gate could probably not be moved due to their large weight, resulting in them being left in place.

=== Present-day ===
Today, the temple is one of the main landmarks the town of Naxos, and is often used as an emblem representing the entire island. It is visited by large numbers of tourists during the summer months, with large crowds often gathering there during the sunset. The entrance to the islet is free of charge.

== Sources ==
- Kariotis, Panagiotis. Naxos the Eternal. Athens: Speech Processing Institute, 2004
- Kotsakis, Athanasios. Naxos during the Venetian occupation. Athens: Pelasgos, 2001
- Naxos : Archaeological sites; museums; nature; history; architecture; attractions; beaches; accommodation; maps: A complete travel guide. Minakakis, Vassilis; Sigala, Neli [Ed.]. Athens: Explorer, 2007
