= Lygdamis of Naxos =

Greek tyrant of Naxos from c. 546 BC to c. 524 BC

Lygdamis (Greek: Λύγδαμις) was the tyrant of Naxos, an island in the Cyclades, during the third quarter of the 6th Century BC.

He was initially a member of the oligarchy which ruled Naxos. In 546 BC, Lygdamis supported the former Athenian tyrant Peisistratos in his landing at Marathon, which led to the restoration of Peisistratos to power in Athens. As a reward, Peisistratos helped Lygdamis become tyrant of Naxos or to reclaim that position after losing it. He secured his position by exiling potential rivals and extended his dominance over neighbouring islands such as Paros.

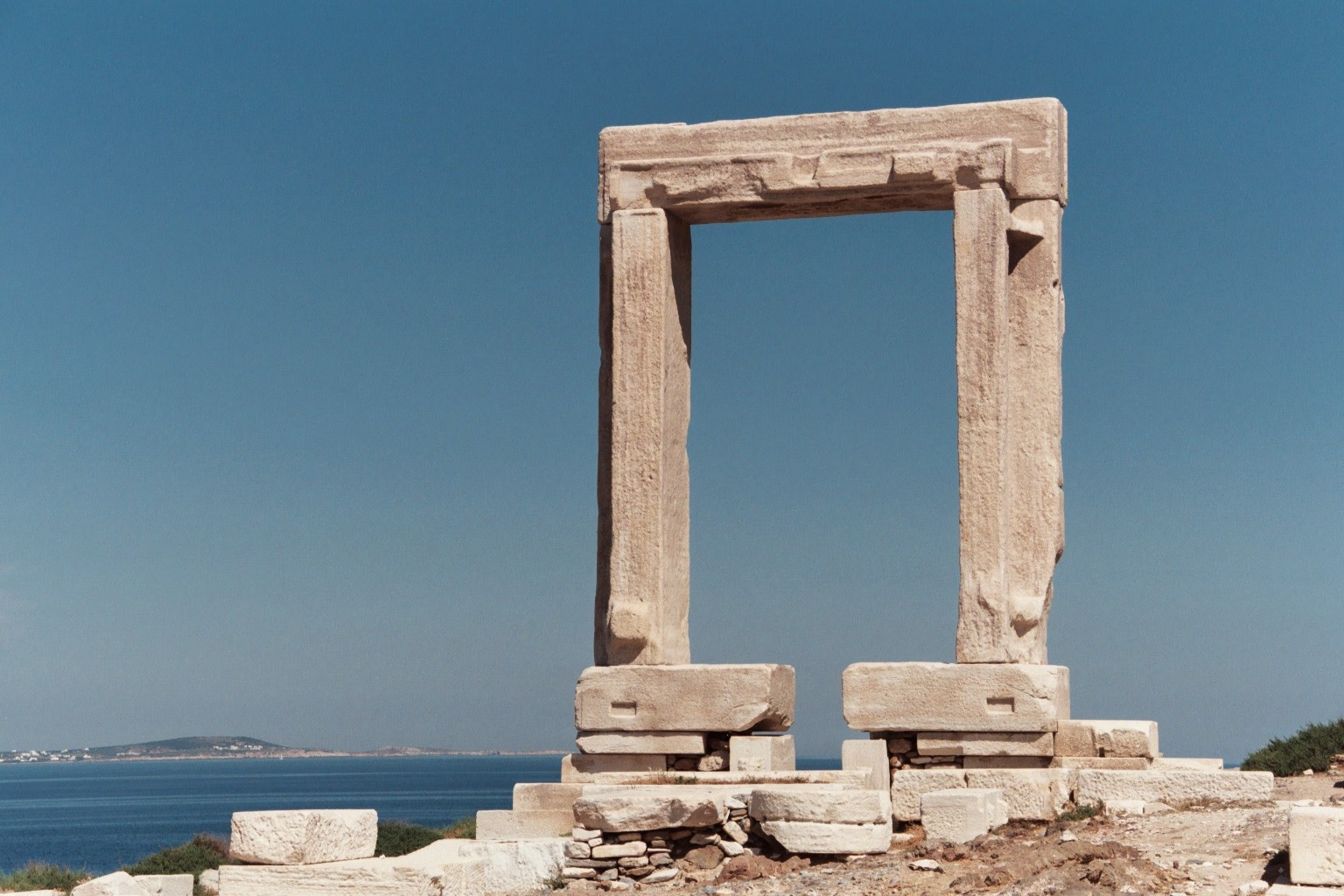
The Portara, the lintel of Lygdamis' Temple of Apollo at Naxos

Lygdamis contributed a force of mercenaries to aid his ally Polycrates, the powerful tyrant of Samos, in his campaigns against Miletus and Mytilene. Lygdamis had an ambitious building program which included several temples and an aqueduct that provided water to the city of Naxos. In 530 BC he began work on a large Temple of Apollo which was never completed. The Portara, the lintel of the temple, stands today as one of the chief landmarks of Naxos.

In 524 BC, Lygdamis' rule over Naxos was ended when he was overthrown by the intervention of a Spartan army. Naxos continued to prosper in the years immediately after Lygdamis' rule under a new oligarchy.
