= Naxian marble =

Type of marble from Greece

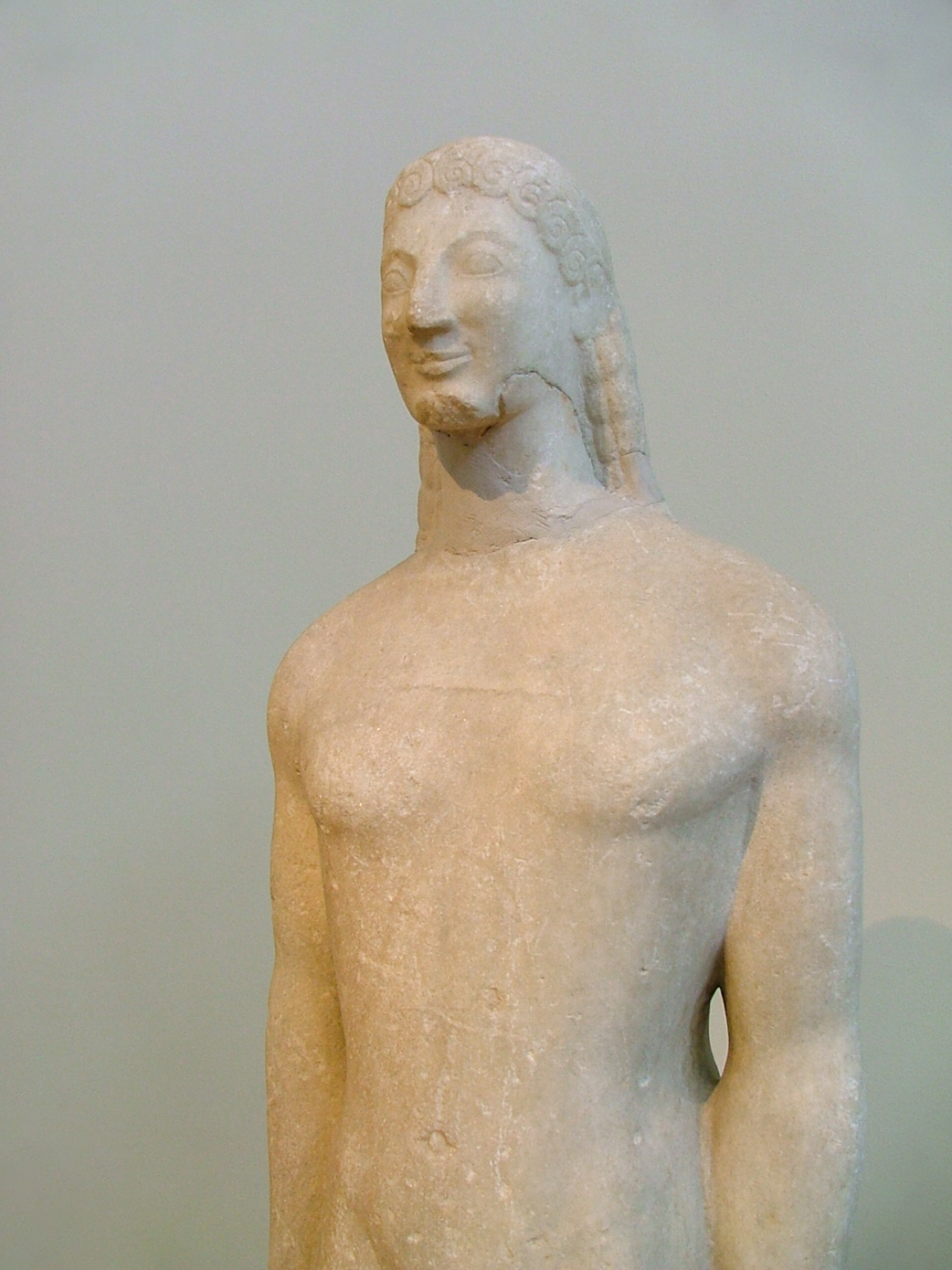
Statue of a Naxian marble Kouros found at Ancient Thera and on display in the National Archaeological Museum Athens

Naxian marble is a large-crystaled white marble which is quarried from the Cycladic Island of Naxos in Greece. It was among the most significant types of marble for ancient Greece and it continues to be quarried in modern times.

== Creation, mineralogy, properties ==
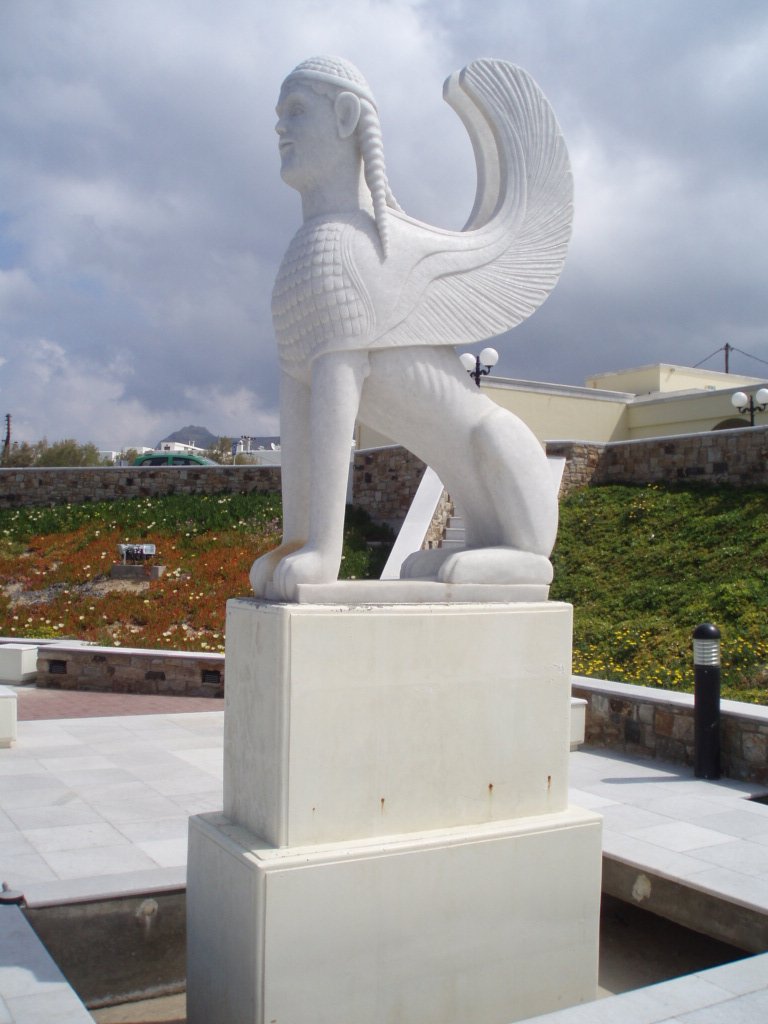
Modern sphinx statue in front of the city council buildings of Naxos city.

The marble's creation is owed to high level metamorphic processes in a contact zone with dome-like bulges of migmatite. The two types of stone alternate in layers and the marble has a thickness of up to 30 metres in old fissures. The layers strike in a northeasterly direction.

Naxian marble is over 98% calcite. Other component minerals as dolomite, silicate and traces of graphite and pyrite. Calcite crystals are randomly distributed and usually transparent. This transparence gives the stone an appearance of depth and is the cause of the blue-grey shimmer of the marble, which is more or less noticeable depending on the angle of the light source. The crystals are up to 15 millimetres in diameter and it is thus one of the largest grained marbles on Earth. In the assessment of Raymond Perrier, it has a resistance to frost and other weathering.

Other parts of the deposit have a grey colour and are clearly striped, which indicates a higher level of impurities. This variant includes the unfinished Kouros of Apollonas in a quarry near Apollonas at the north end of the island.

In many parts of the deposit, there are grey, black and coloured mineral grains in the calcite crystals of the stone at a microscopic scale, making the crystals appear cloudy. Minor organic impurities are the cause of the slightly bitumen-like smell emitted while the marble is worked; it disappears after working.

== Quarries ==
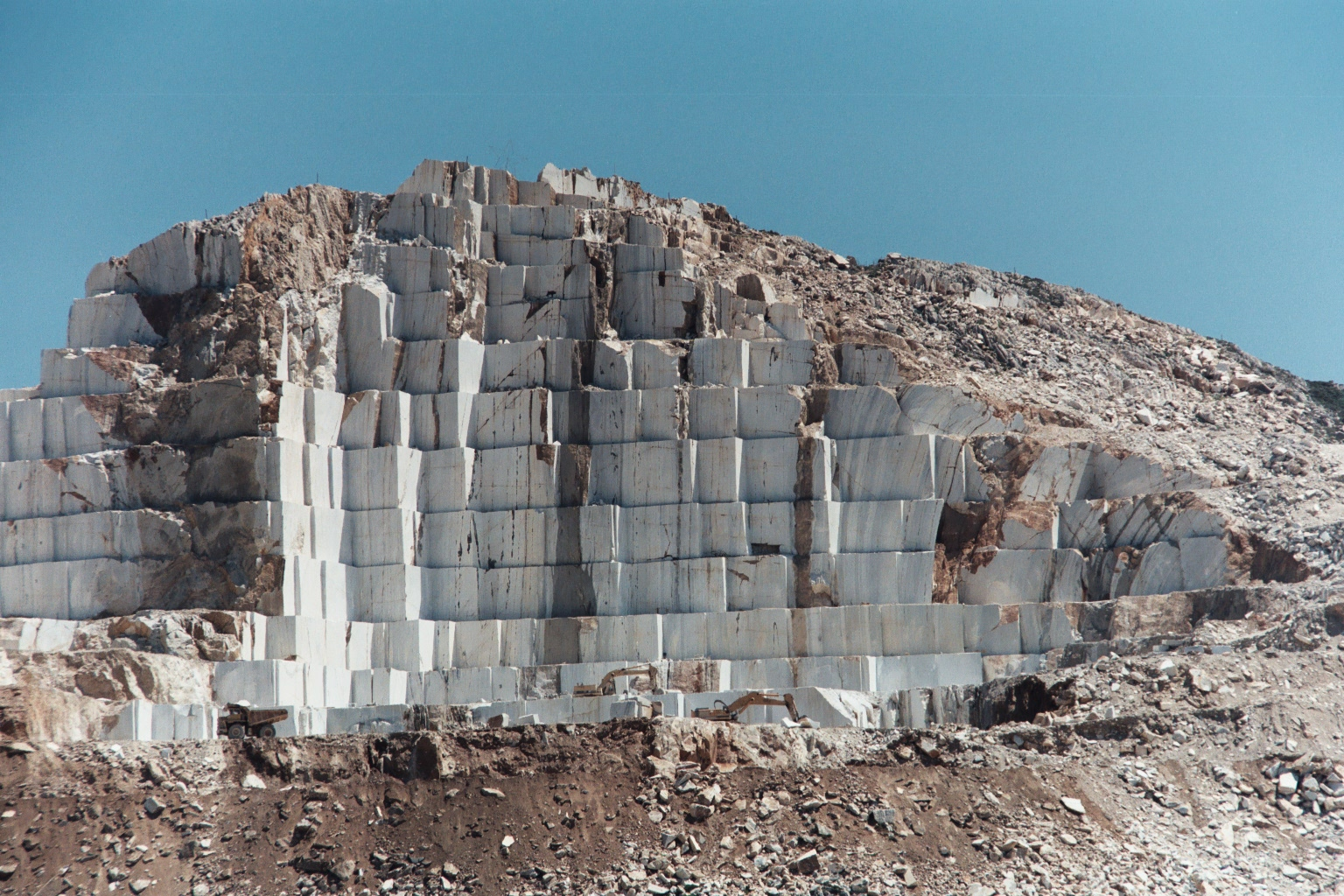
A modern quarry of Naxian marble near Kinidaros and Moni

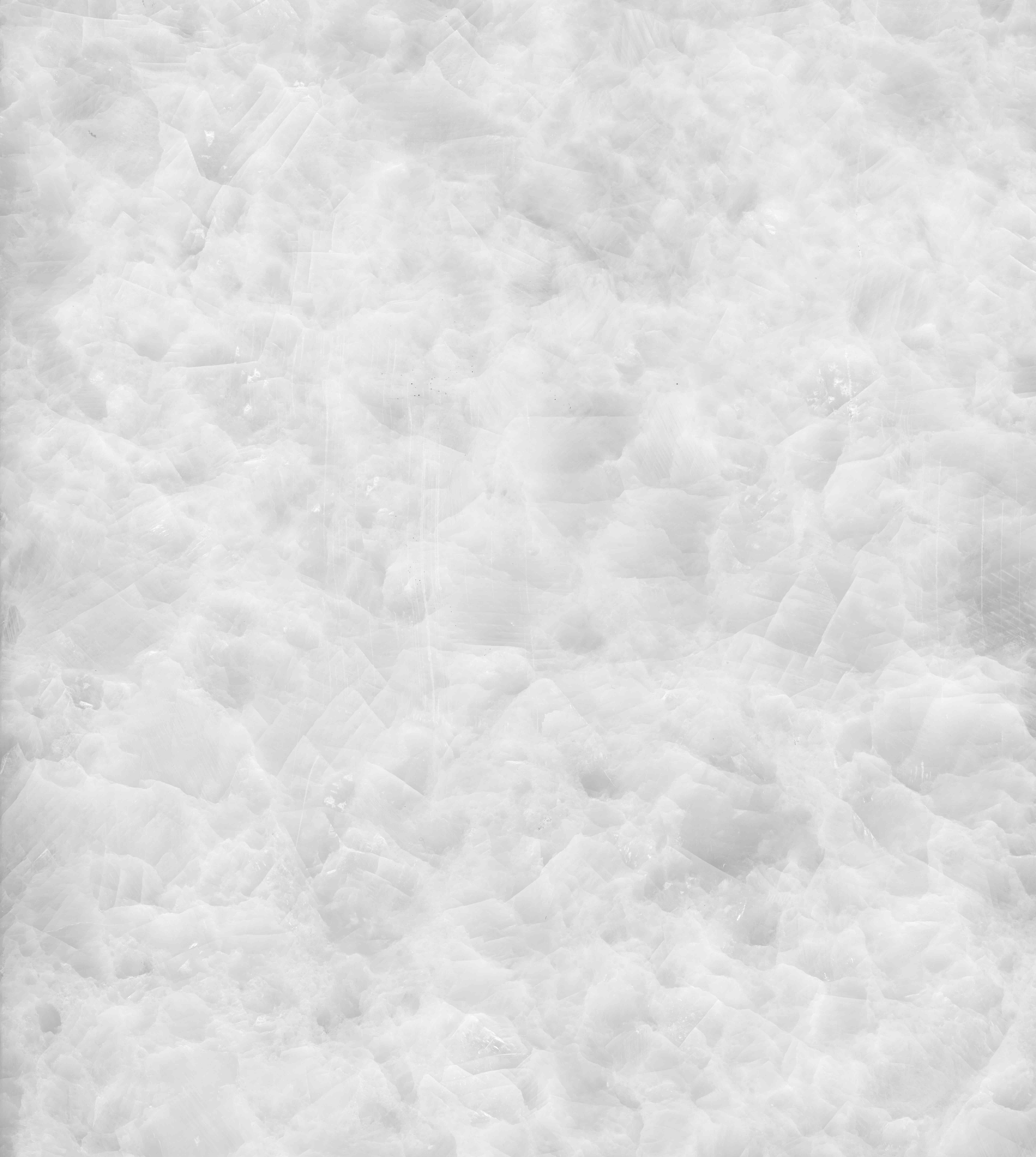
Pattern of the large-grained, light grey to blue Naxos marble

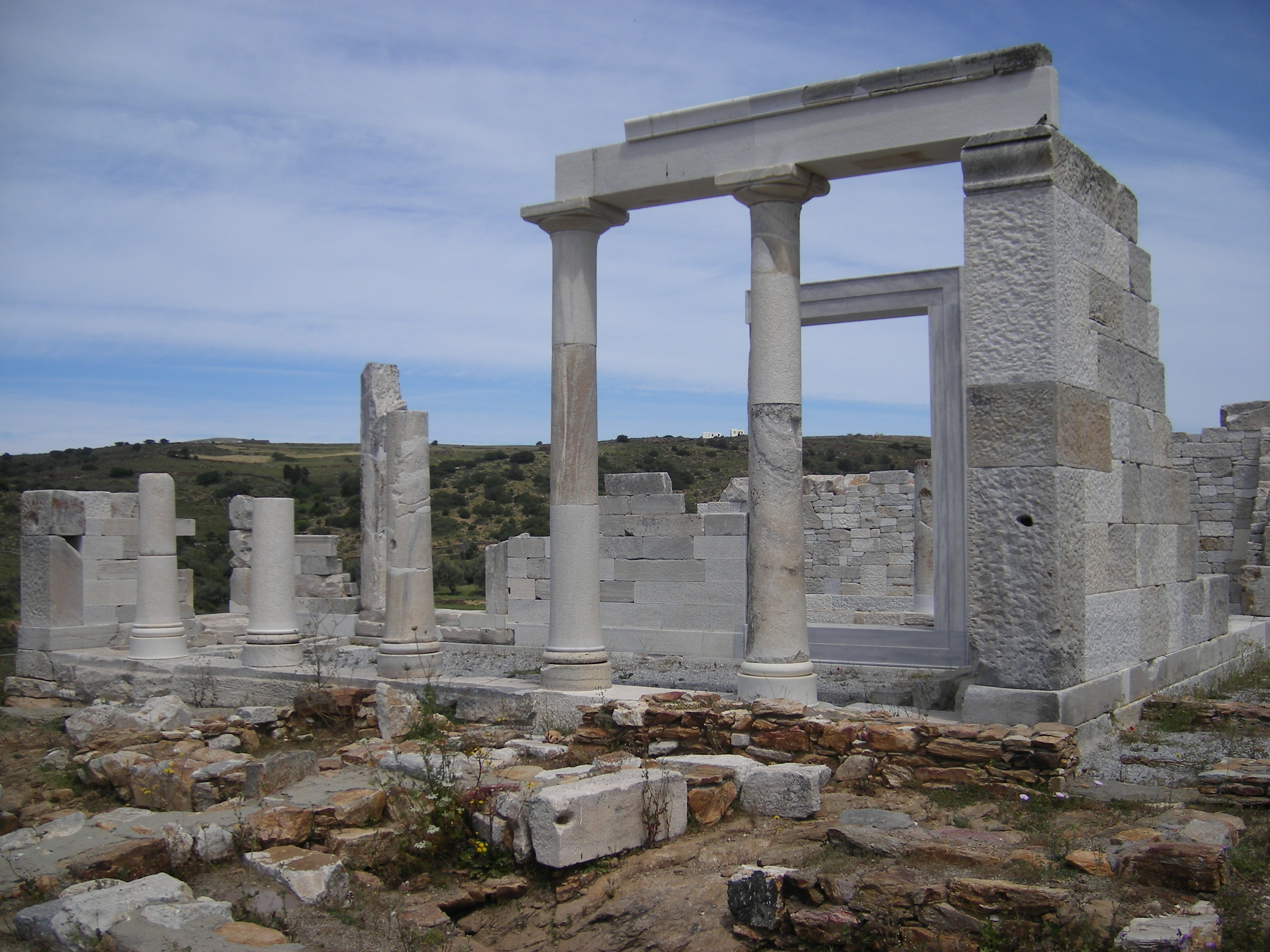
Temple of Sangri on Naxos

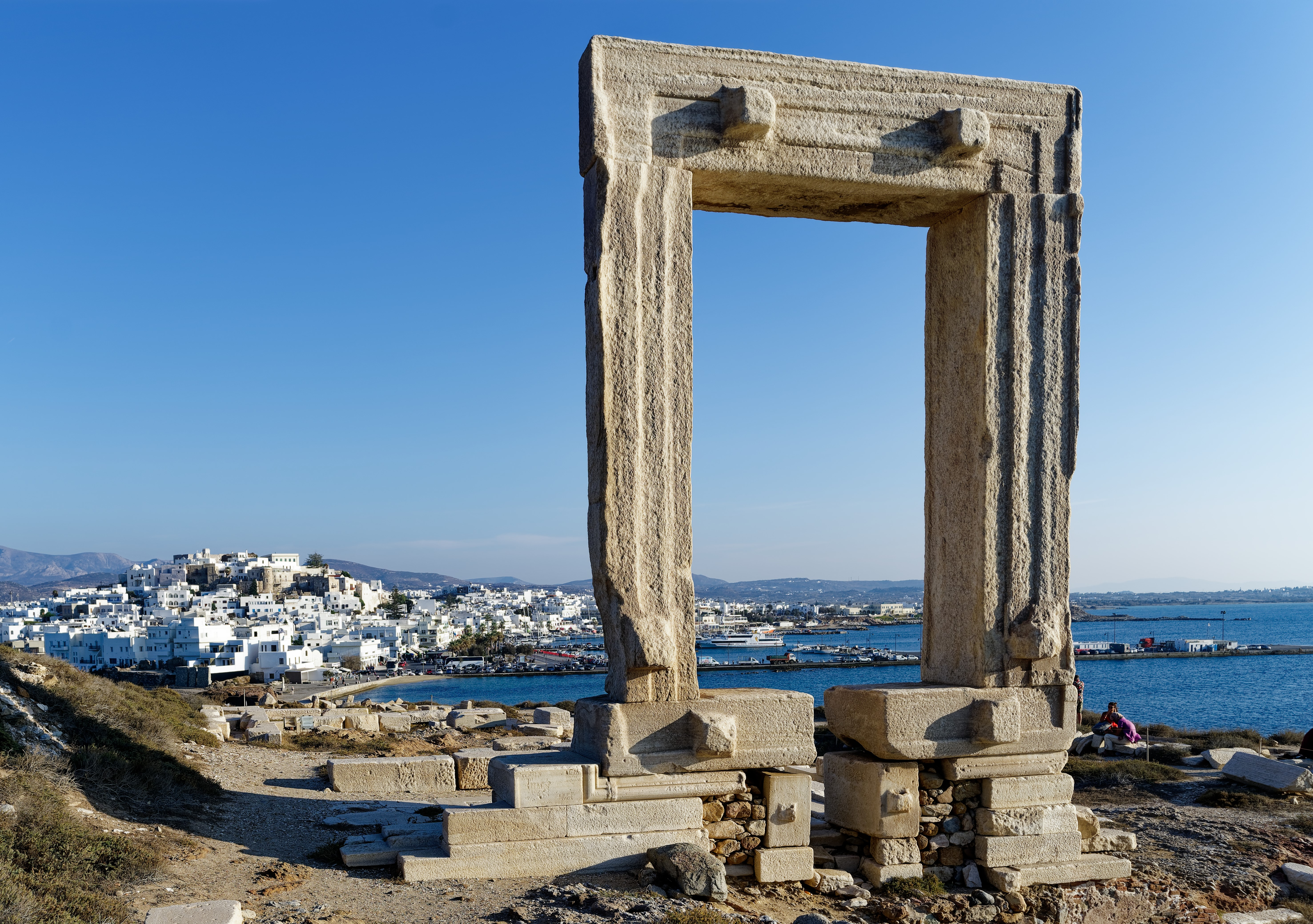
Temple of Apollo on Naxos

Ancient marble quarries are located in the north part of Naxos and near Apollonas, as well as in the central region of Melanes. Some unfinished ancient pieces, like the Kouros of Apollonas or the two Kouroi of Flerio are found in these quarries. Modern quarries are located near the village of Kinidaros in the central part of the island.

== History ==
The use of this marble began in antiquity and has continued ever since. It was among the first types of Cycladic "island marble" to be used. It is the largest-grained marble which was used in ancient times.

It was already suggested by Richard Lepsius in 1890 that Naxian marble was used for the creation of ancient roof tiles at Olympia and on the Athenian Acropolis, which subsequent research affirmed. In Roman times, Naxian marble has ceased to play an important role and Pliny the Elder does not mention it once.

== Use and shaping ==
Naxian marble is used for sculpture and decoration. In the Mediterranean region it is often employed for outdoor purposes. During the quarrying process, whiter parts of the stone are preferred. This preference has a direct impact on the price of Naxian marble in commerce. On the island it is used as a construction material for window and door frames as well as marble plaster; tailings are used as gravel and in road construction. About 5,000 m³ of high value Naxian marble is exported annually.

Numerous practical and artistic deployments of Naxian marble can be found on the island. These include a modern Sphinx statue in front of the city council building of the city of Naxos, the remains of the Temple of Demeter at Sangri, the Temple of Apollo (the emblem of Naxos) and many masonry constructions in the villages.

== Bibliography ==
- C. Colotouros: Marmor & Technologie. Vol. 2. Athen (no date)
- K. Germann, Gottfried Gruben et al.: "Provenance Characteristics of Cycladic (Paros and Naxos) Marbles — A Multivariate Geological Approach." In: Classical Marble: Geochemistry, Technology, Trade. 1988, pp. 251–262.
- G. Richard Lepsius: Griechische Marmorstudien. Verlag der Königl. Akademie der Wissenschaften, Berlin 1890 (Full text).
- Friedrich Müller: Internationale Natursteinkartei kompakt. Vol 82.4.
- Raymond Perrier: Les roches ornementales. Edition Pro Roc, Ternay 2004, ISBN 2-9508992-6-9.
