= Naxos (city) =

Naxos Χώρα Νάξου
- Settlement
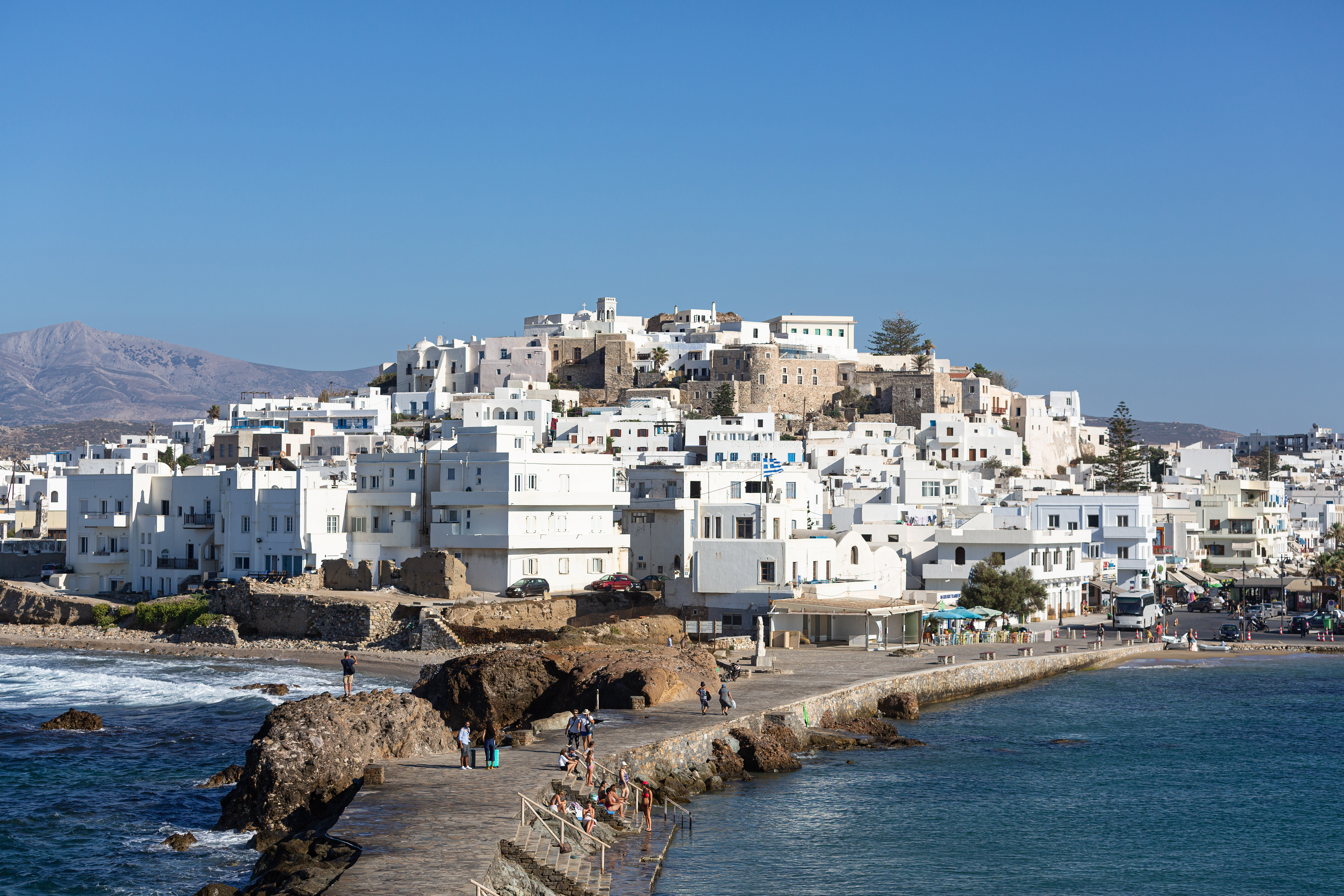
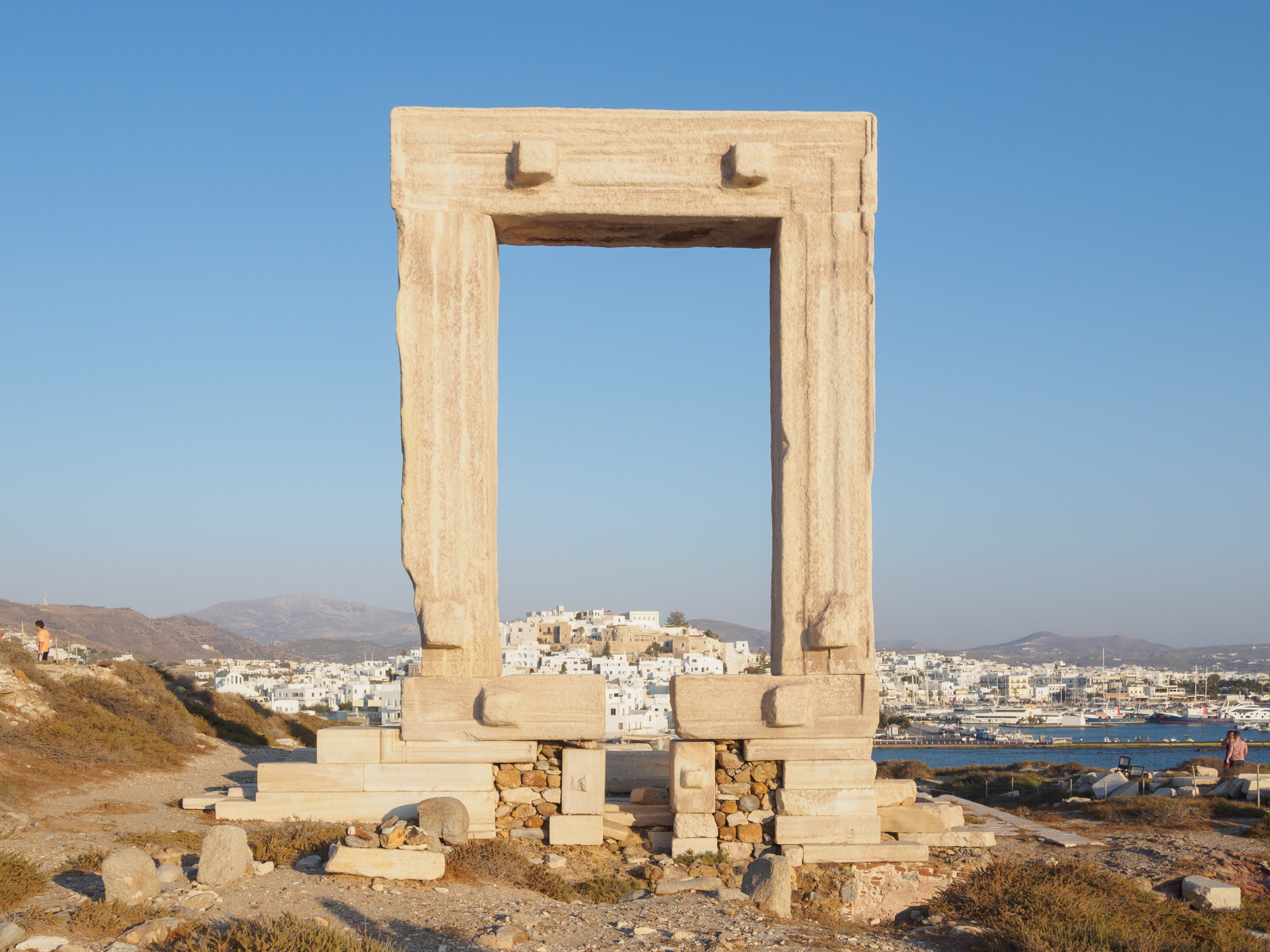
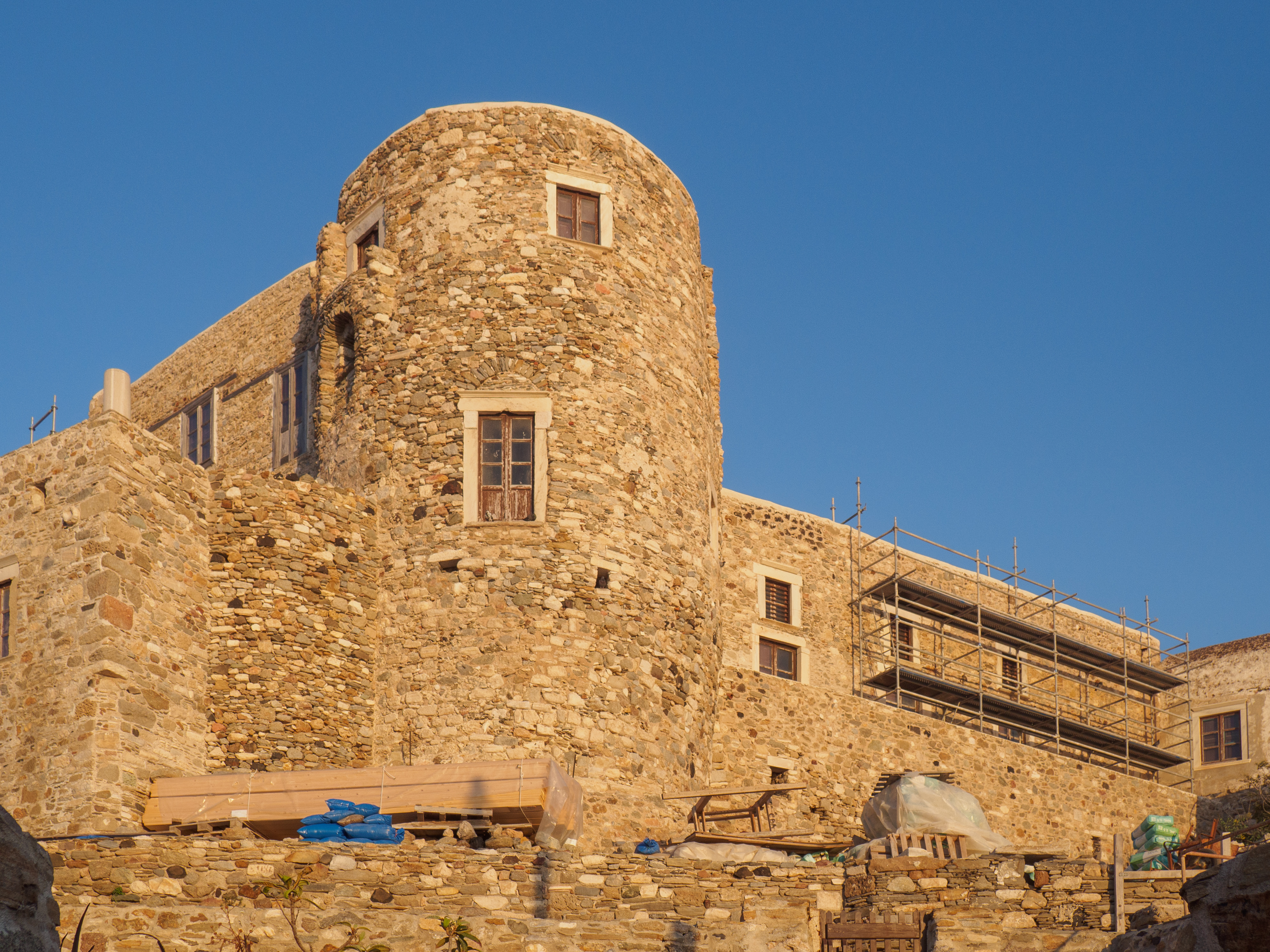
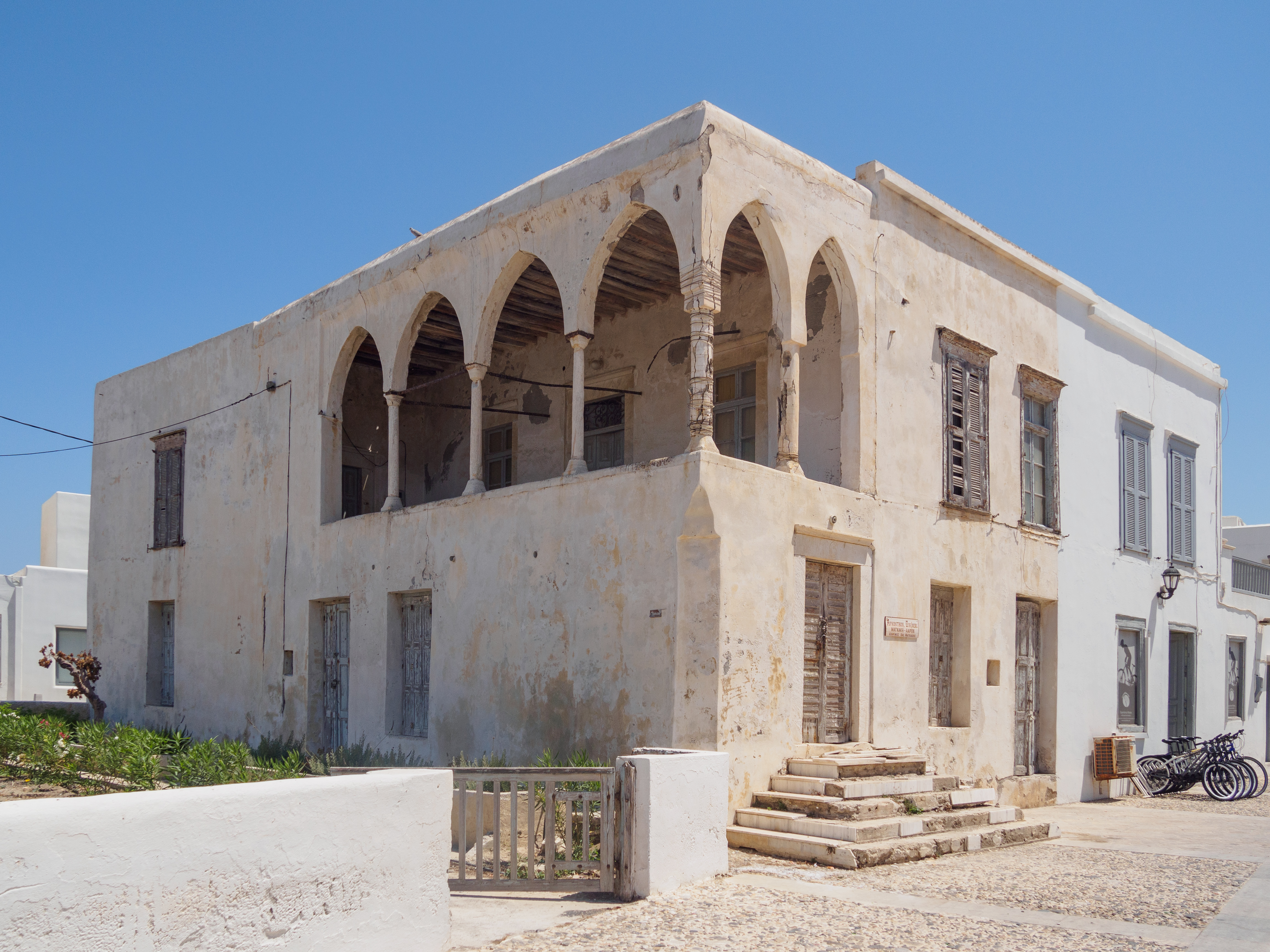
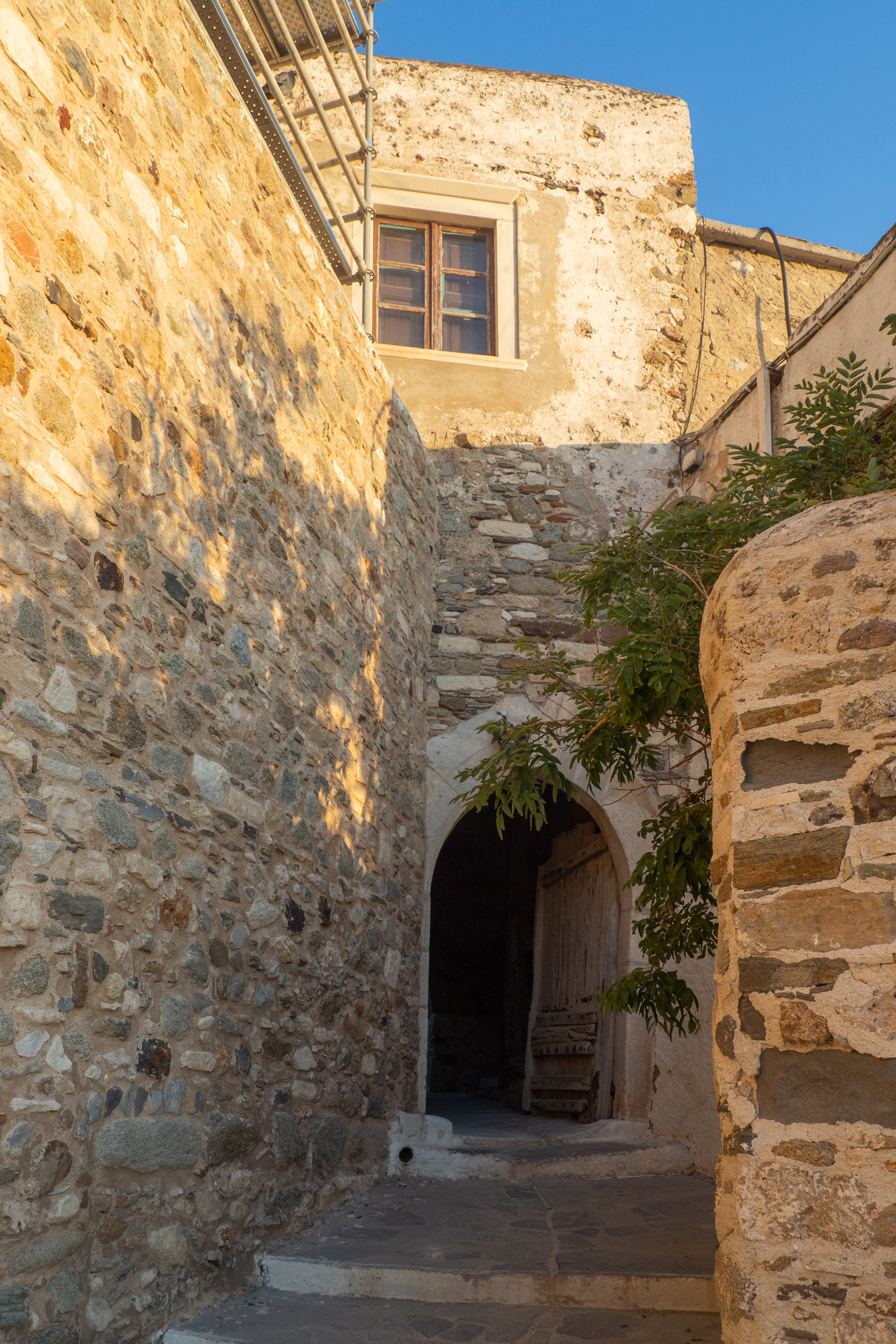
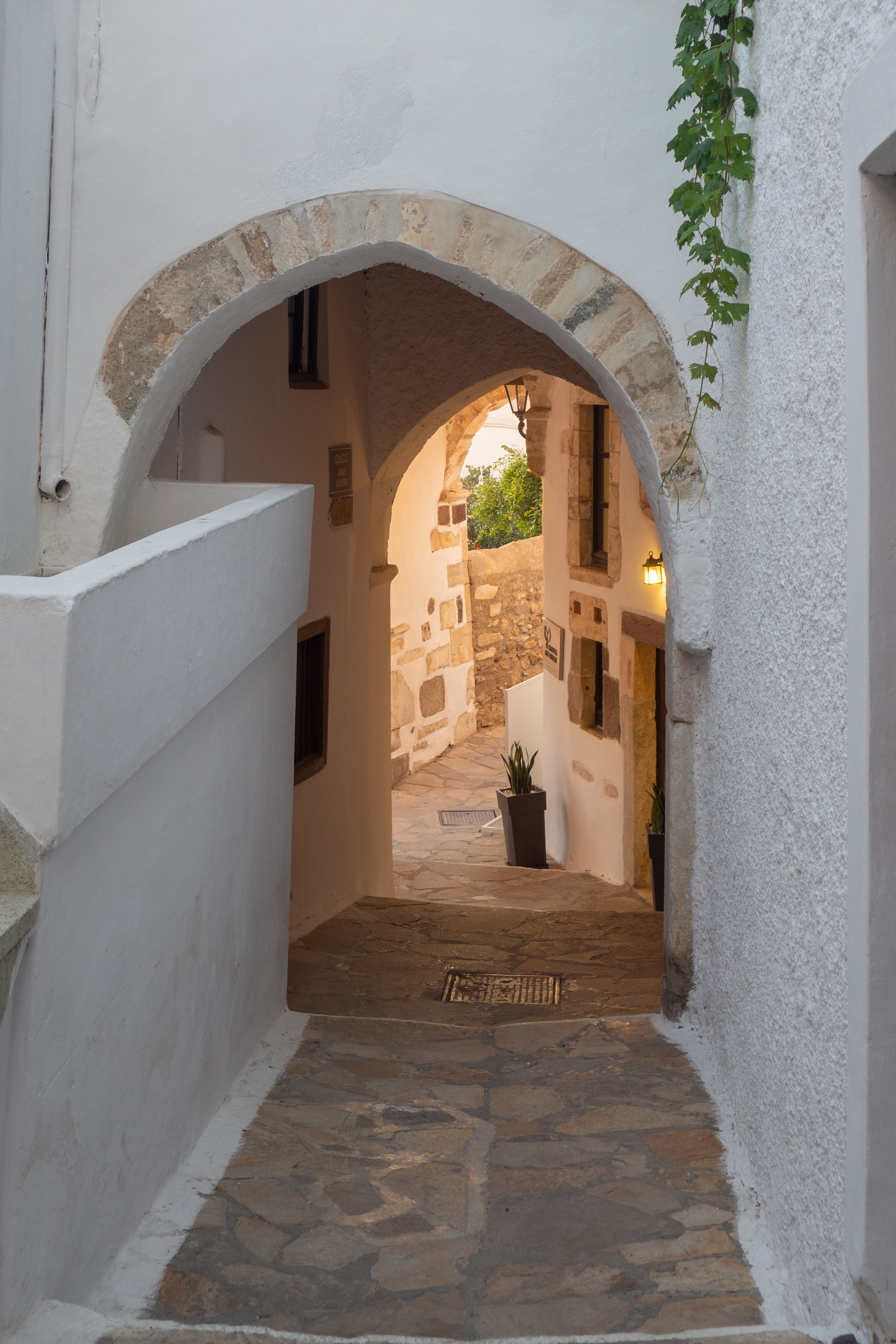
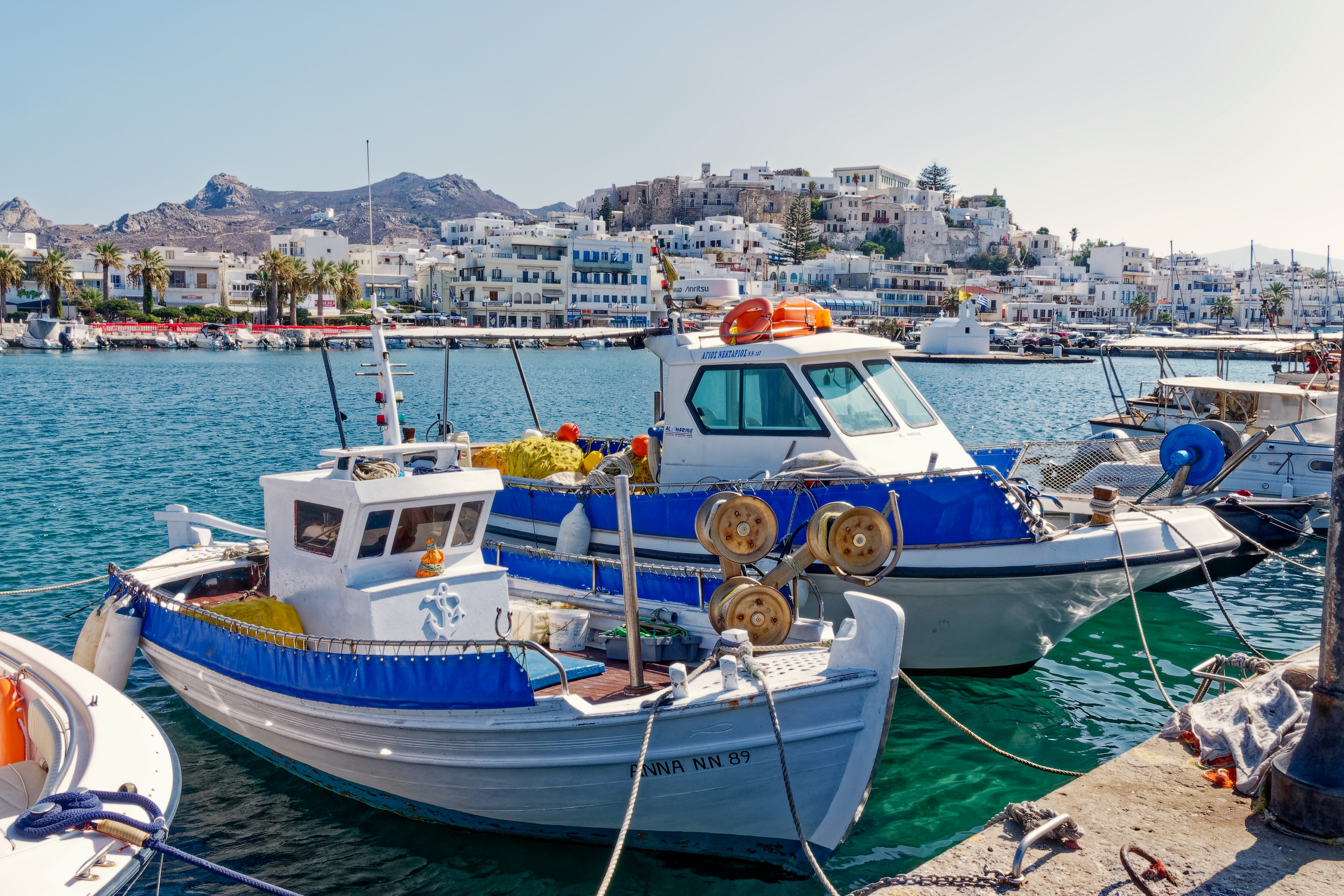
- From top to bottom, left to right: View of the town from Palatia, Temple of Apollo, Castle of Naxos, Magkaki - Aaron Mansion, Castle Gate, Street in Old Town, Naxos Port.

- Location within the regional unit

- Location within Greece
- Coordinates: 37°6′N 25°22′E
- Country: Greece
- Administrative region: South Aegean
- Regional unit: Naxos
- Municipality: Naxos and Lesser Cyclades

Area
  - Municipal unit: 126.957 km^{2} (49.018 sq mi)
- Elevation: 11 m (36 ft)

Population (2021)
  - Municipal unit: 14,708
  - Municipal unit density: 115.85/km^{2} (300.05/sq mi)
  - Community: 8,897
- Time zone: UTC+2 (EET)
  - Summer (DST): UTC+3 (EEST)
- Postal code: 843 xx
- Area code: 22850
- Vehicle registration: ΕΜ
- Website: www.naxos.gr

Naxos (Greek: Νάξος), commonly referred to as Chora (Greek: Χώρα, meaning 'town'), is a city and a former municipality on the island of Naxos, in the Cyclades, Greece. The community has 8,897 inhabitants (2021 census). It is located on the west side of Naxos Island in the Cyclades island group in the Aegean. It was an important centre of bronze age Cycladic culture and an important city in the ancient Greek Archaic Period. Since the 2011 local government reform it is part of the municipality of Naxos and Lesser Cyclades, of which it is the seat and a municipal unit.

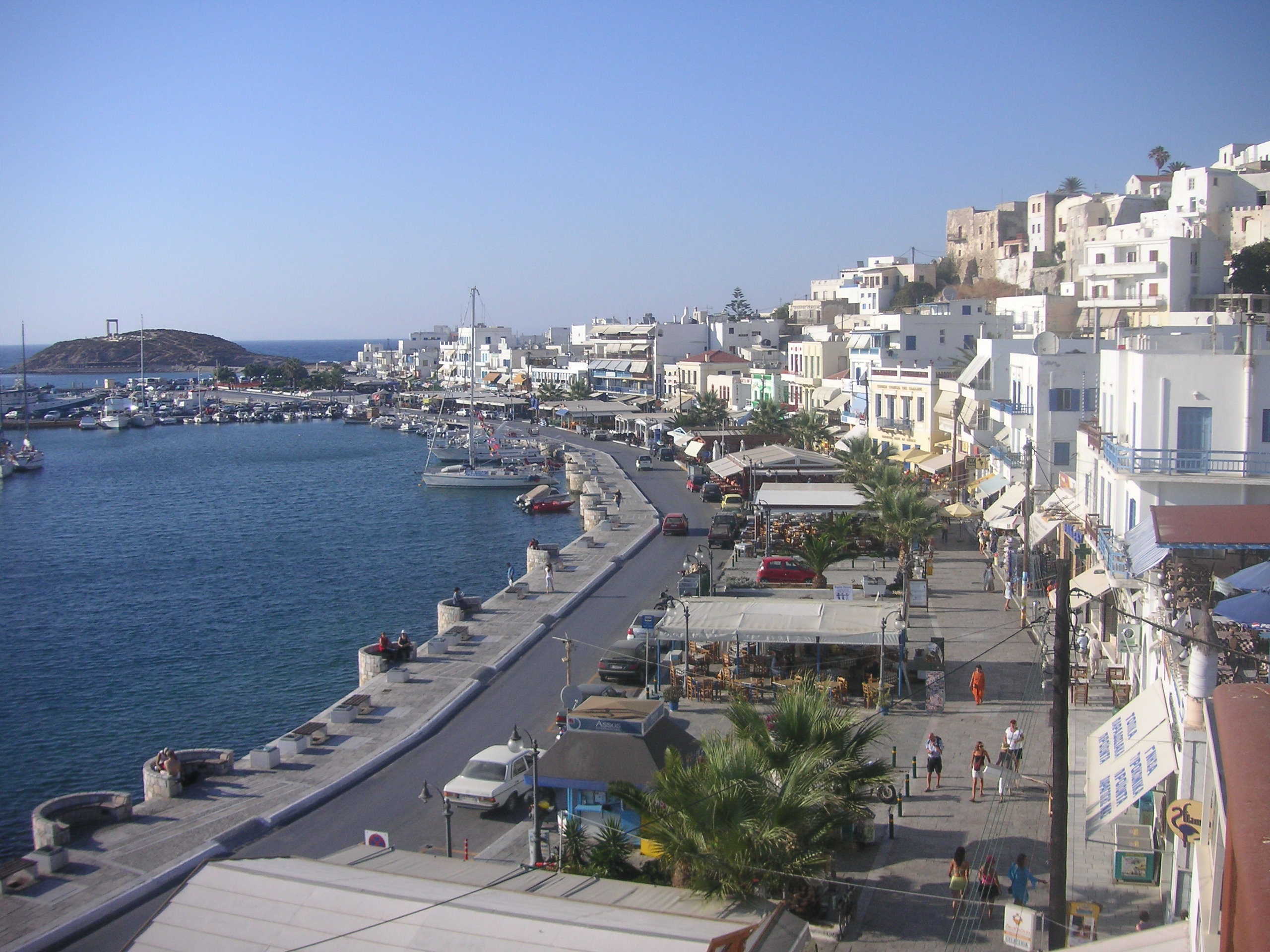
The promenade

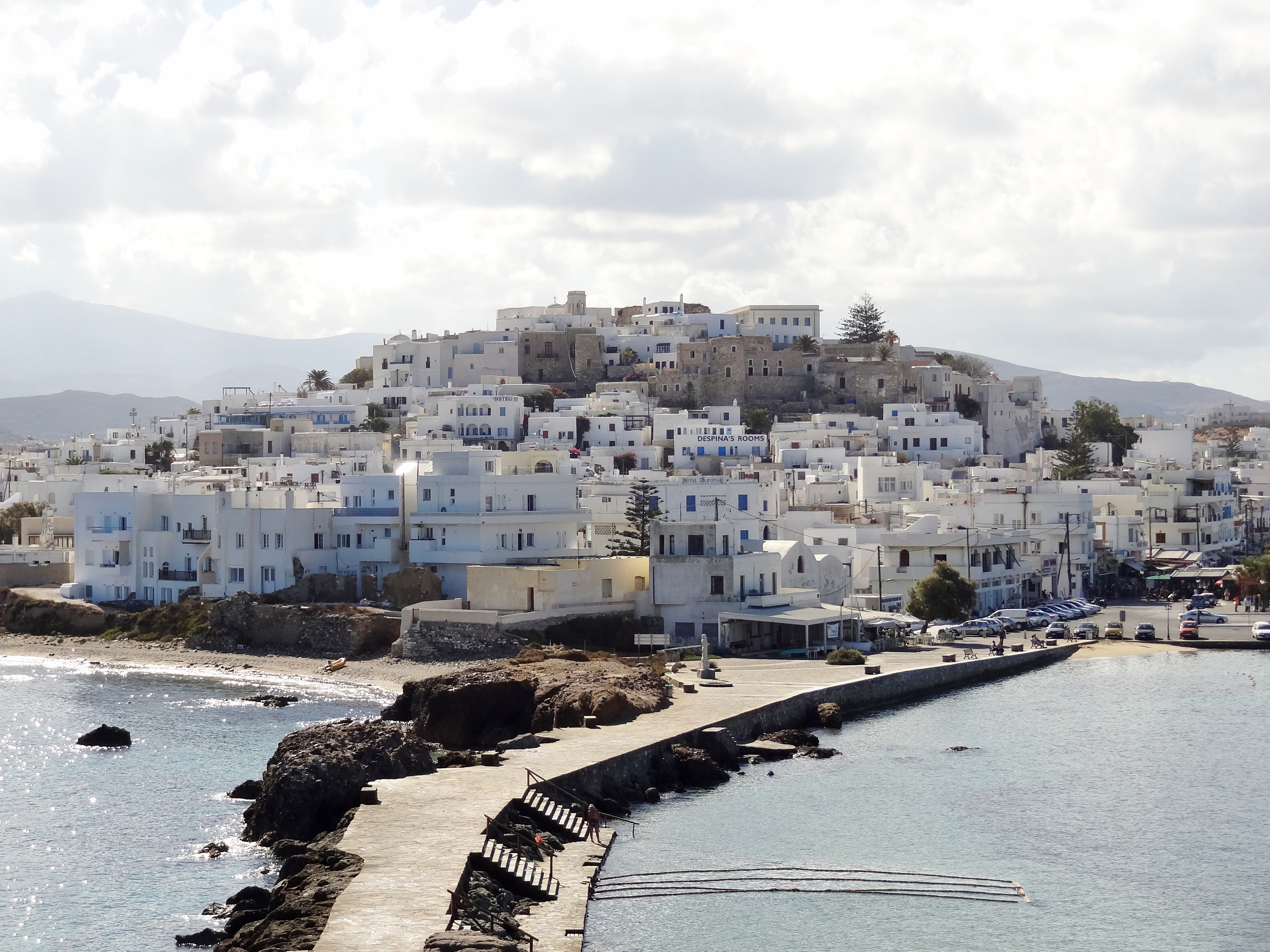
A view from the temple of Apollo

== History ==
=== Prehistory and bronze age ===
The landscape and city of Naxos has been continuously inhabited since prehistory, which is attested by archaeological findings and remains of ancient structures across the island and within the city. Important remains from the Cycladic and later Mycenean civilizations have been found in the area of Grotta and elsewhere.

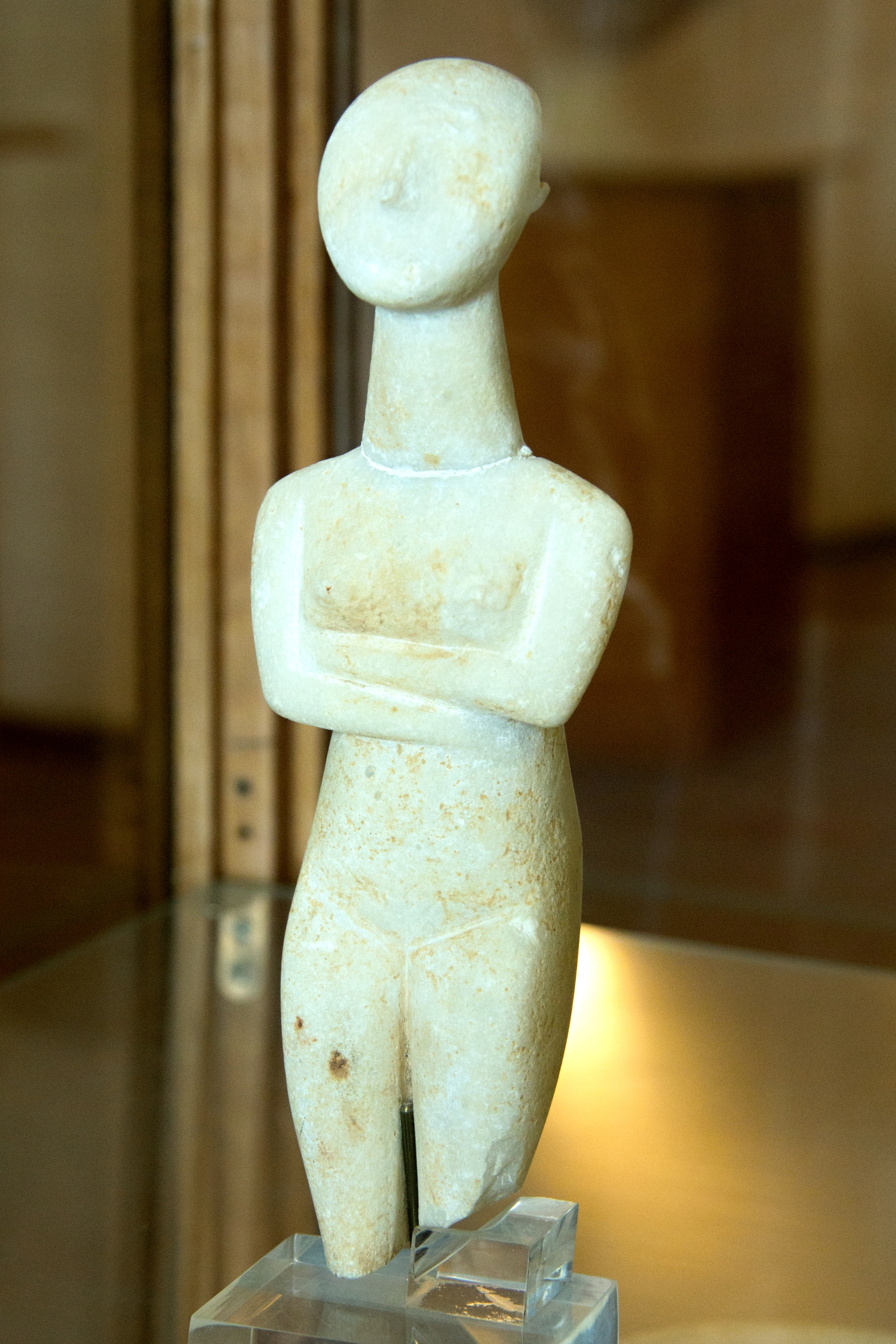
Cycladic figure, Naxos Archaeological Museum

=== Naxos in the Archaic Period ===
During the 8th and 7th centuries BC, Naxos dominated commerce in the Cyclades. Being the largest island among the Cyclades and rich in resources, such as emery and marble, it was able to become one of the most prominent Greek city-states in the archaic period. The city was powerful enough to exert its control over several of the neighboring islands. During the Archaic era, Naxos was also among the first places in Greece where marble sculpture developed. Naxian sculpture from this era has been found all over Greece. The Naxians are even known to have dedicated sculptures and other works in Ancient Greek sanctuaries such as Delos and Delphi.

=== Tyranny of Lygdamis ===
Around 546 BC, after a period of social struggles, an aristocrat named Lygdamis, initially representing the rural population of the island's hinterland, was able to assume power on the island with the support of the tyrant of Athens, Peisistratos. During his rule, several temples and infrastructure projects are known to have been constructed in the city and elsewhere on the island, such as the temple of Apollo on the islet Palatia, the temple of Demeter in Sangri and an aqueduct that provided water to the city. Lygdamis was removed from power in 524 BC by the Peloponnesian League, a military alliance led by Sparta, and some of his building projects remained unfinished, famously including the temple of Apollo.

=== Siege of Naxos ===
In 501 BC the people of Naxos rebelled against the aristocracy, aiming to install a more democratic regime. Many aristocrats fled to the city of Miletus, which was then controlled by the Persian Empire. There, they were able to gain the support of the city's tyrant, Aristagoras, which led him to propose a plan to conquer the island on behalf of the Persians. The plan was authorized in 499 BC and led to a failed invasion of Naxos. This led to the larger Ionian Revolt, and then to the Persian War between Greece and Persia.

=== Persian Wars ===
The city was attacked by a large Persian fleet in 490 BC. This time it was unprepared for the attack, and it was captured and burned. The Naxians were forced to provide four ships to the Persian fleet to fight in the battle of Salamis. However, the ships switched sides under their commander Democritus, and fought against the Persians, helping the Greeks win the battle.

=== Classical Period ===
After the end of the Archaic Period, Naxos never regained its former power and importance. It became part of the Delian League, a military alliance led by Athens. Naxos was the first city to revolt from the League in 471BC, but it was forced by Athens to remain a member.

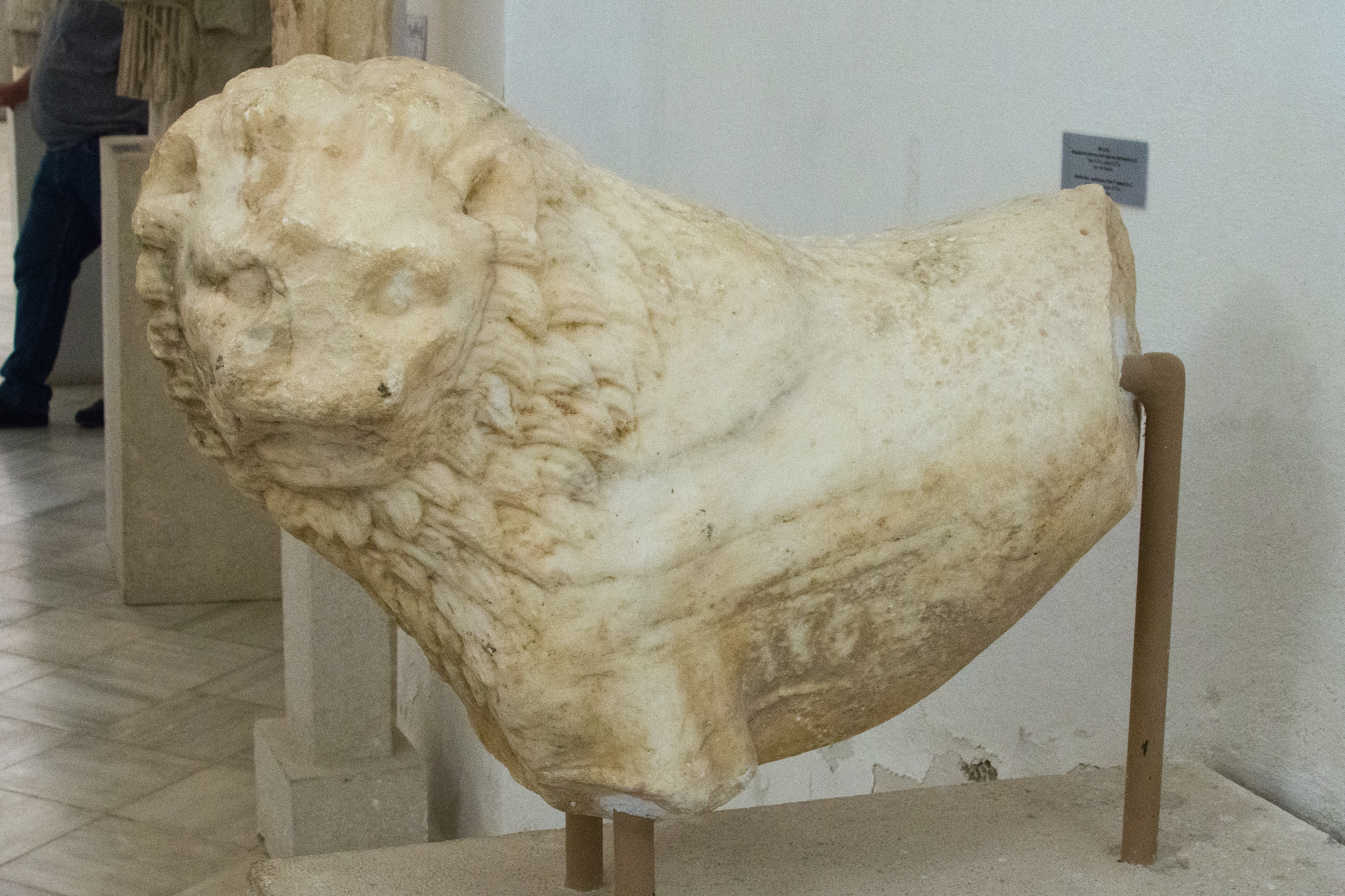
Lion sculpture, 4th c. BC, Naxos Archaeological Museum

=== Later periods ===
Naxos continued to exist as a city during the Hellenistic and Roman periods, from which building remains still exist. During the Byzantine period, the town was partially abandoned due to its vulnerability against frequent pirate attacks, and much of the population moved to the island's hinterland. A new capital was established near the center of the island, protected by the castle of Apalirou.

=== The Dukes of Naxos ===
From 1207 to 1566, the city of Naxos was made the capital of the Duchy of the Archipelago by the Venetian Marco Sanudo, who had conquered the island and named himself 'Duke of Naxia' or 'Duke of the Archipelago'.

In the aftermath of the Fourth Crusade in 1204, with the Byzantine Empire disestablished and a short-lived Latin Empire under the influence of the Venetians established in its place at Constantinople, Sanudo seized the opportunity to conquer Naxos and soon captured the rest of the islands of the Cyclades. Sanudo ruled directly over Naxos and Milos and appointed governors on all the other islands. The Duchy also had its own currency: the ducat.

Sanudo moved the island's capital from the interior back to its original (and current) position on the seaside. Its harbor was better than Potamides, where he had originally landed with his fleet to conquer the island. He built at least one pier. The location of this pier is thought to be partly under the chapel of Panagia Myrtidiotissa. On the old acropolis, Sanudo built the Kastro, the town's fortress. It comprised the palace, the exterior walls, a keep, a gothic chapel (since destroyed), the houses of the Latin families and the Catholic cathedral. Greeks built their houses between the harbor and the fortress, in the suburbs of Bourgos and Nio Chorio. The suburb of Bourgos was mainly inhabited by a middle class of merchants, landowners and artisans. Nio Chorio, on the other hand, was the part of the city where mainly poor peasants lived.

Twenty-one dukes in two dynasties (Sanudo and Crispo) ruled the Archipelago, until 1566; Venetian rule continued in scattered islands of the Aegean until 1714.

=== Ottoman Naxos (1566–1821) ===
Under the Ottomans, the administration on the island remained essentially as it had been in the hands of the Venetians; the Sultans' concern was satisfied by the returns of taxes. The title of Duke of Naxos was no longer hereditary, instead being appointed by the Ottoman Sultan. Very few Turks ever settled on Naxos, and Turkish influence on the island is slight. During this period, the local islanders were able to demand and gain more rights over time, such as religious, administrative and judicial freedoms, as well as tax reductions.

Piracy was rampant during the Ottoman period, with Muslim and Christian pirates devastating Naxos and the nearby islands by destroying and looting houses or entire villages, stealing livestock and even capturing locals and selling them to slavery. Especially from the 17th century onwards, with an increased presence of western European countries in the Eastern Mediterranean sea, pirates from western Europe, and especially France, caused a lot of problems on the islands. The Ottoman Empire could not deal with the pirates by force, and thus often resorted in granting them privileges and giving them titles to prevent further damage to its coastal areas.

Turkish sovereignty lasted until 1821, when the islands revolted; Naxos finally became a member of the Greek state in 1832.

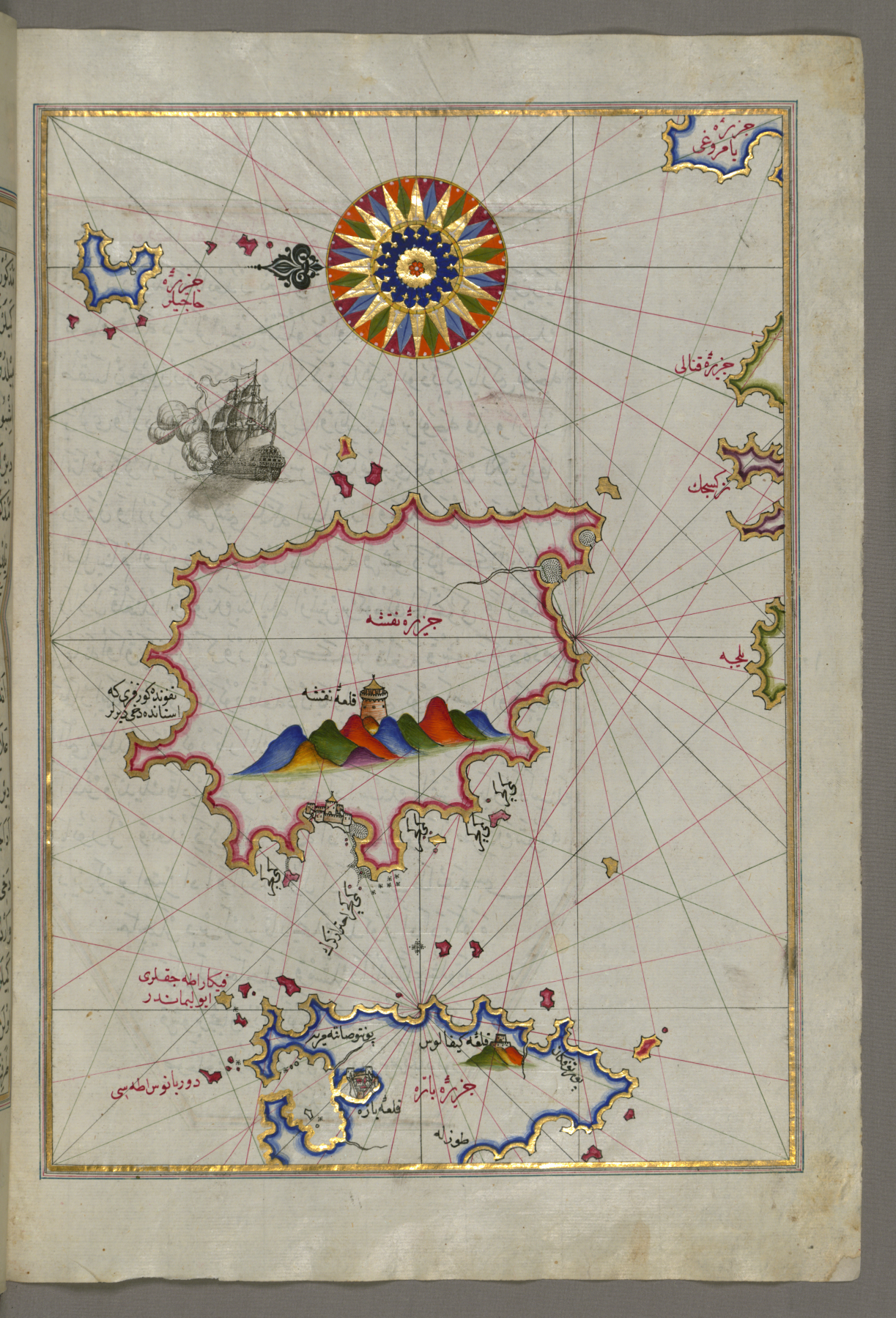
Naxos on a Turkish (Ottoman) map by Piri Reis

== City districts ==
The city can be divided into a number of districts and neighborhoods, each with a distinct history and characteristics. This includes the old and new parts of the town.

=== Old Town ===
The Old Town is the city's historic center, comprising roughly 30% of the city's area today. It is composed of several parts, namely Grotta, Bourgos, Kastro and Nio Chorio.

==== Grotta ====
Grotta (Greek: Γρόττα) is the name of the city's northern beach, also referring to the area of the city that lies near its shore. The name comes from the Venetian word Grota, meaning 'cave', referring to the many small caves under the cliff at Aplomata. The area contains some old churches and the oldest primary school in the city, which functions since 1835. Grotta was the location of the Mycenean city of Naxos, the remains of which can still be seen, although they are partly underwater. Parts of the old city can be viewed in the underground 'In-Situ' museum under the square in front of Naxos' Orthodox Cathedral.

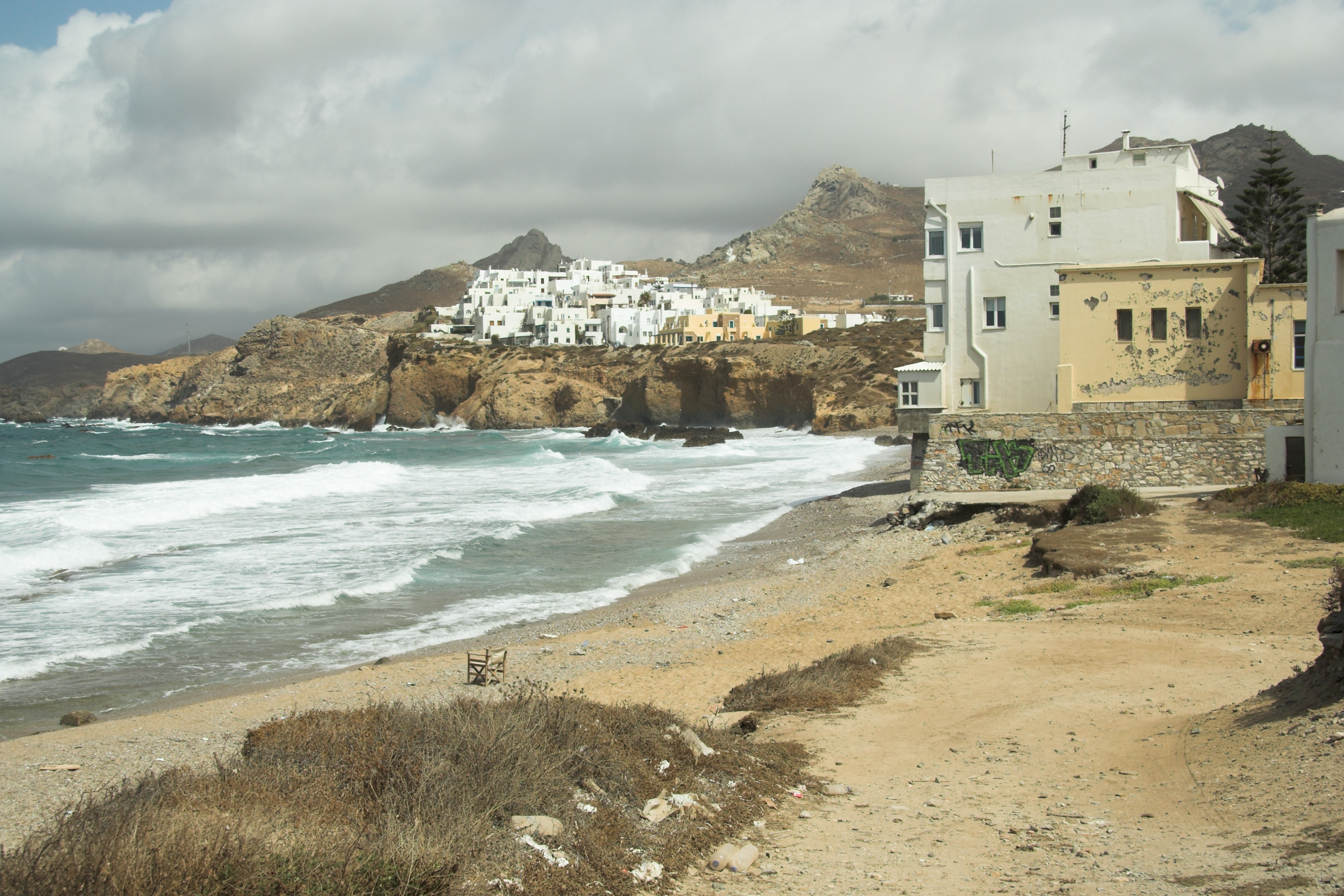
Coast of Grotta. In the back, the area of Aplomata, also known as New Grotta

==== Bourgos ====
Bourgos (Greek: Μπούργος) is the name of the district north of the castle. Traditionally, it was inhabited by the city's merchants and artisans, and, in general, by a 'middle class' of people whose main occupation was not agriculture. The name comes from the Venetian word borgo, which refers to a kind of fortified settlement. This part of the city was lightly fortified and only accessible by three gates. The houses are built very close to each other, with the streets being very narrow and winding, with a lot of dead ends. This layout is often likened to a labyrinth, and it is believed that it was built this way in part to disorientate any intruders, most notably pirates. All roads going in or out of Bourgos eventually lead to the castle or towards the sea. The area has a high density of churches, some small squares, arched passageways, and white houses, following the typical Cycladic architecture. Right next to Bourgos, outside one of the gates, there is the neighborhood of Evriaki (Greek: Εβριακή, meaning 'Jewish'), which used to be the city's Jewish quarter.

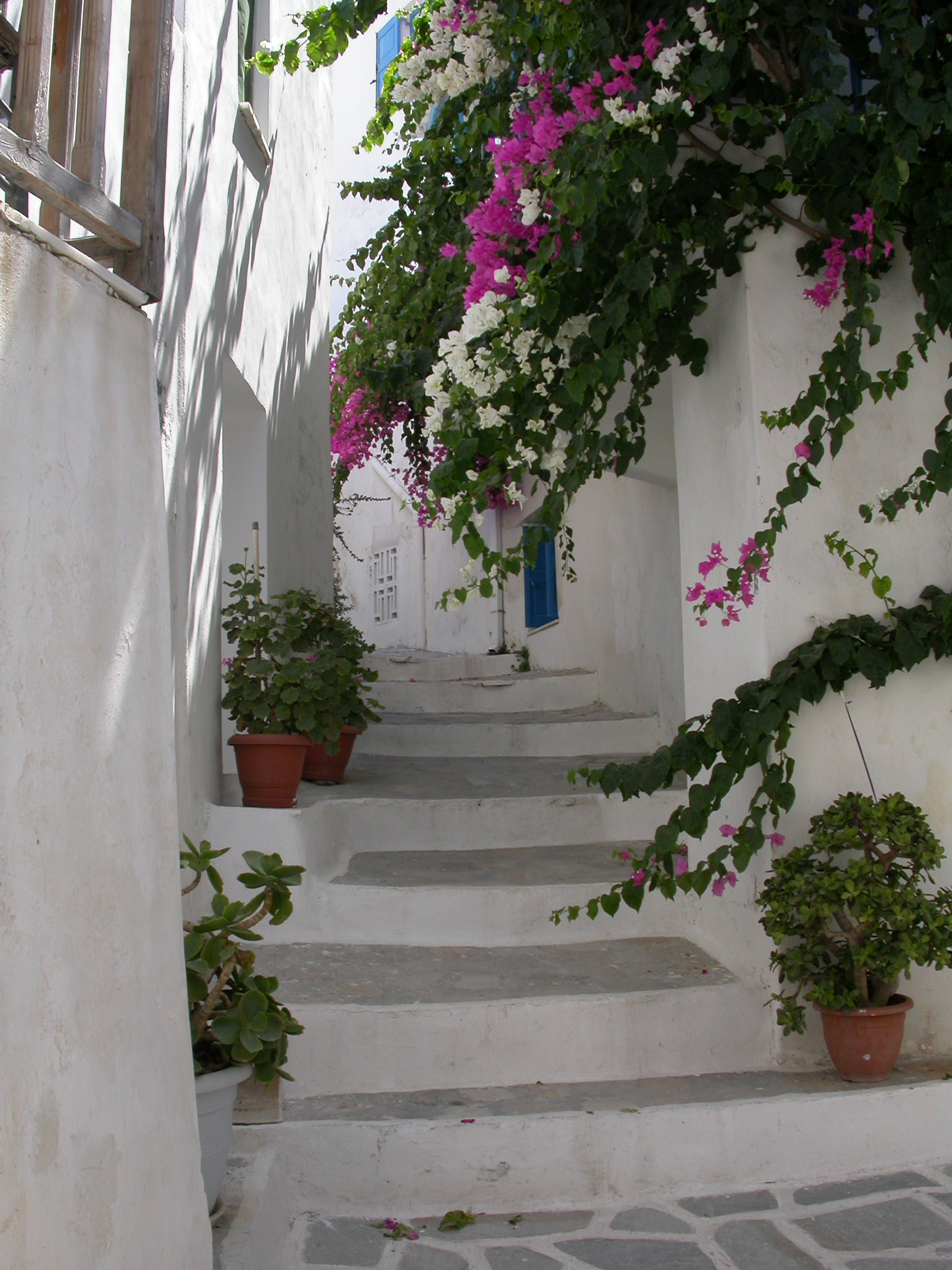
A street in Bourgos

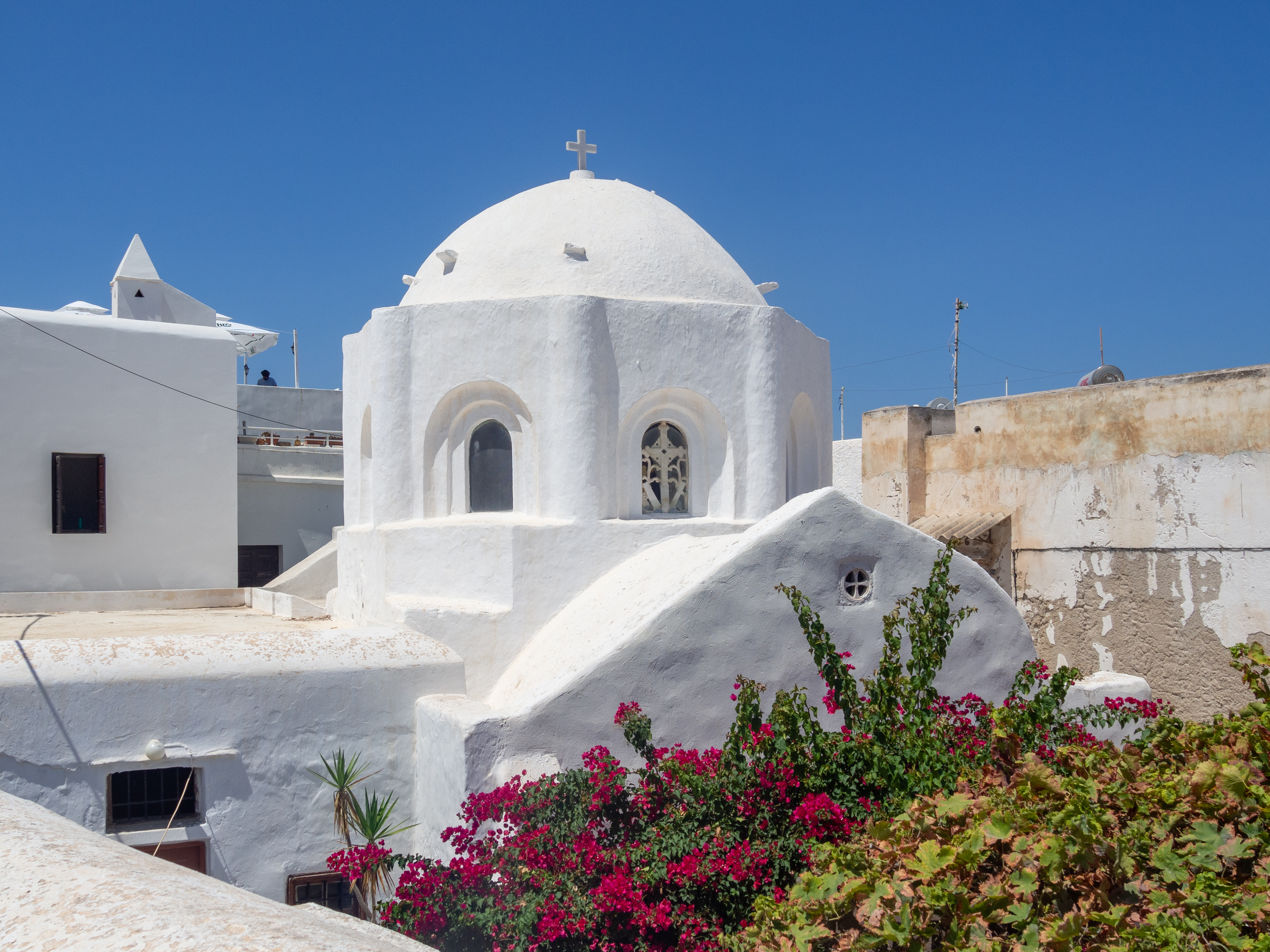
Panagias Christou Church

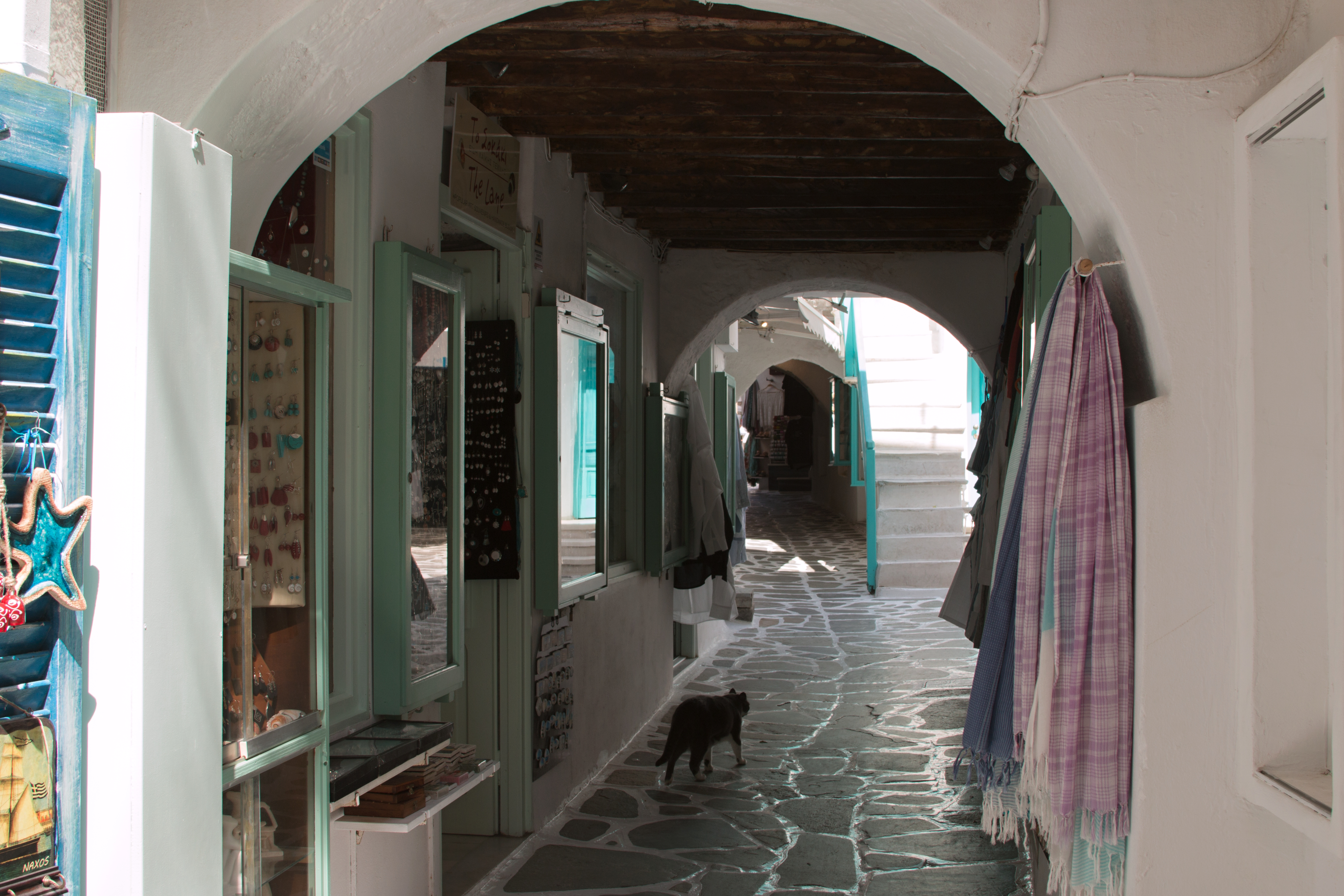
Old Market

==== Kastro ====
The Kastro (Greek: Κάστρο, meaning 'castle') is a fortified circular fortress built on top of a hill on which the ancient city's acropolis once stood. The walls consist mostly of buildings in a circular, defensive arrangement. There are two gates to the castle: the main gate, called Trani Porta (Greek: Τρανή Πόρτα, meaning 'Great Gate') and a secondary gate called Paraporti (Greek: Παραπόρτι, meaning 'side gate'). The Kastro is not just a castle in the sense of a fortification, but rather it contains an entire medieval town, which is still largely preserved in its original form. Founded in 1207 by Marco Sanudo, it was inhabited by the Venetian and Latin lords and aristocrats who ruled over the island for many centuries, with some of their descendants still residing there to this day. The Kastro contains large houses, often with family crests above the doors, as well as a number of Catholic churches and monasteries. Notable buildings include the Catholic Cathedral of Naxos, the Ursuline School, the Merchant Academy and the remains of the tower of Sanudo, a large tower at the castle's central square whose height is thought to have exceeded 30 meters. Another important surviving part of the castle is the Crispi tower (or Glezos tower), a round tower built next to the main castle gate, and the castle's only tower that survives today. It is currently being used to house a museum.

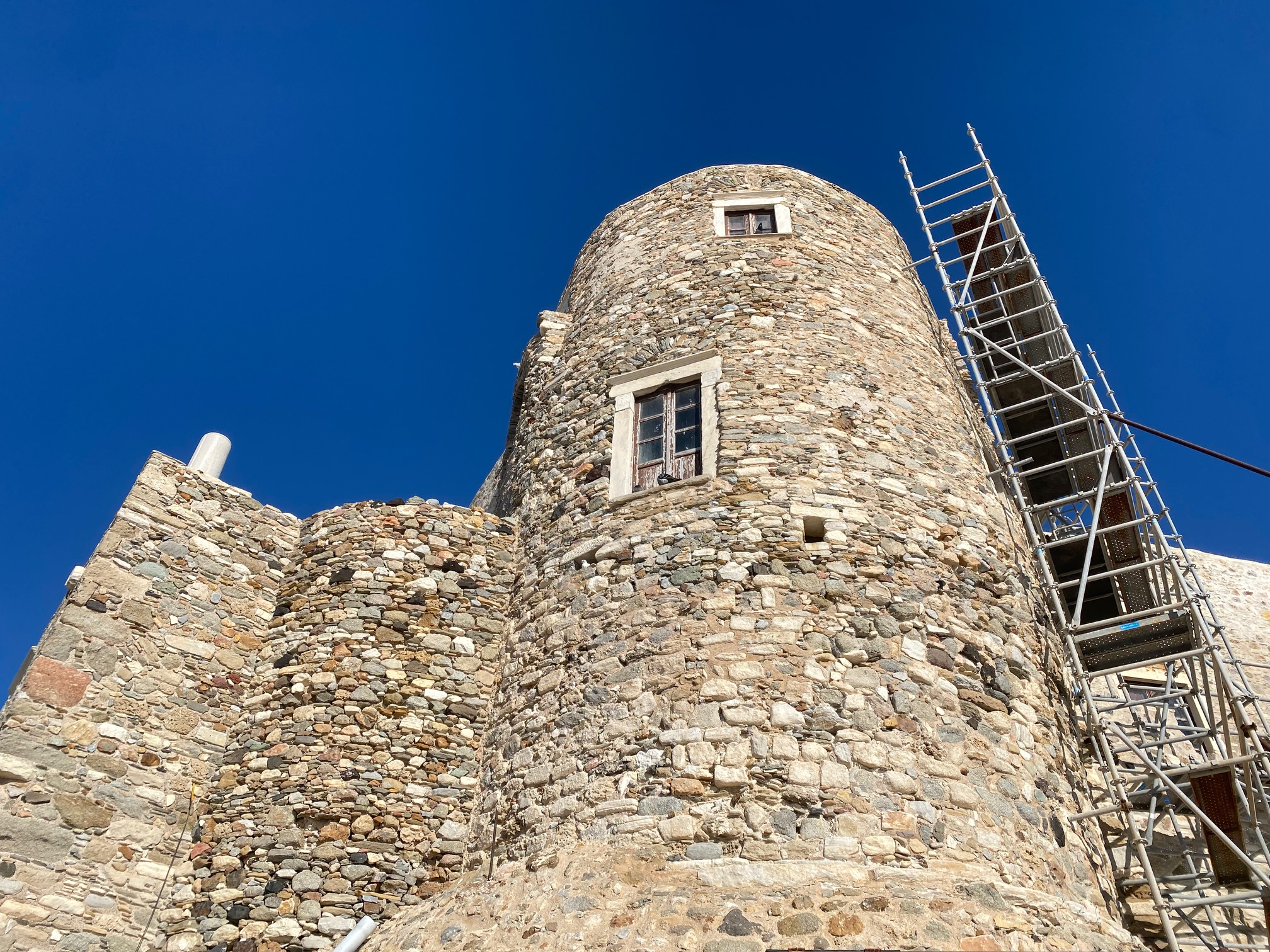
Glezos tower

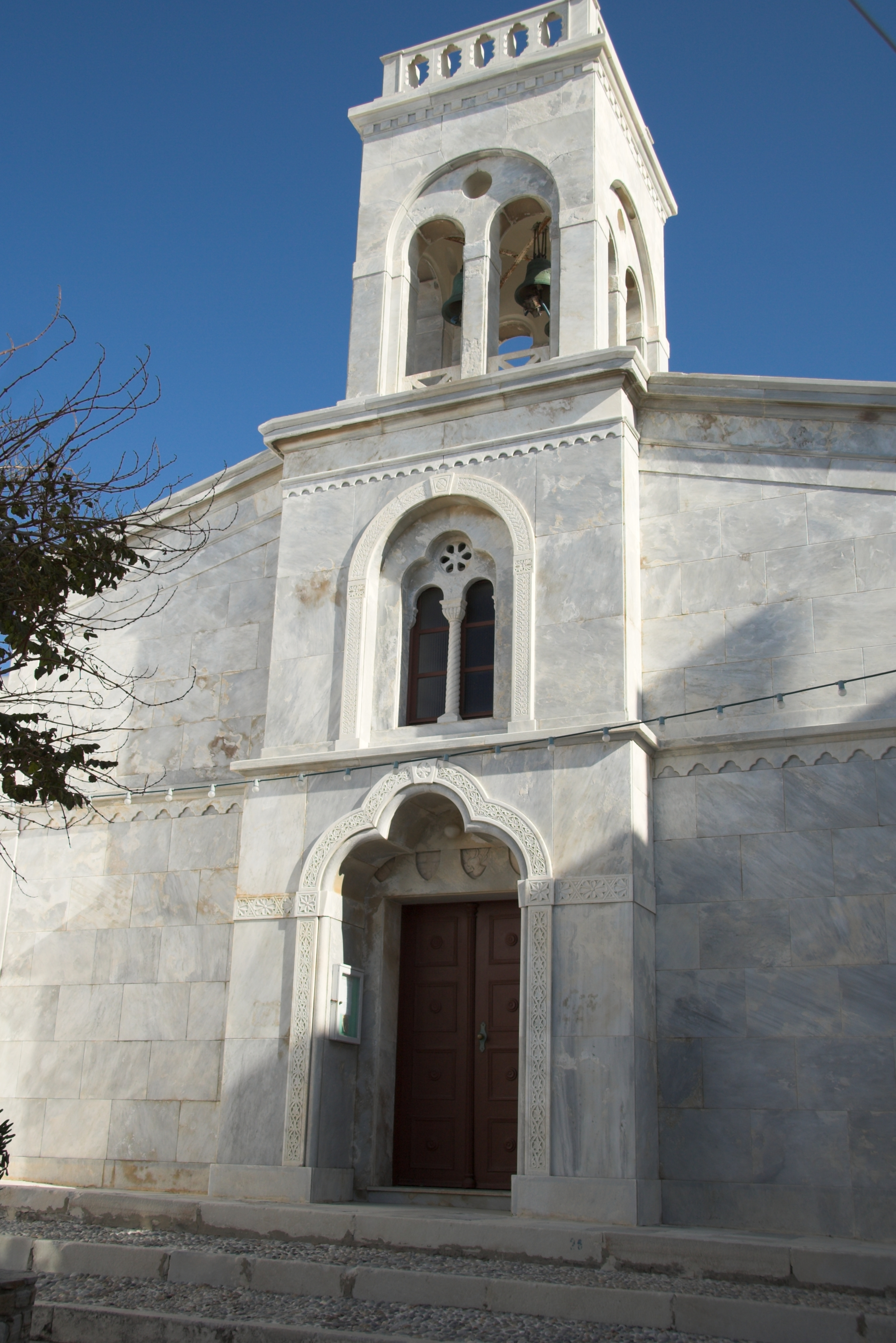
Catholic Cathedral of Naxos

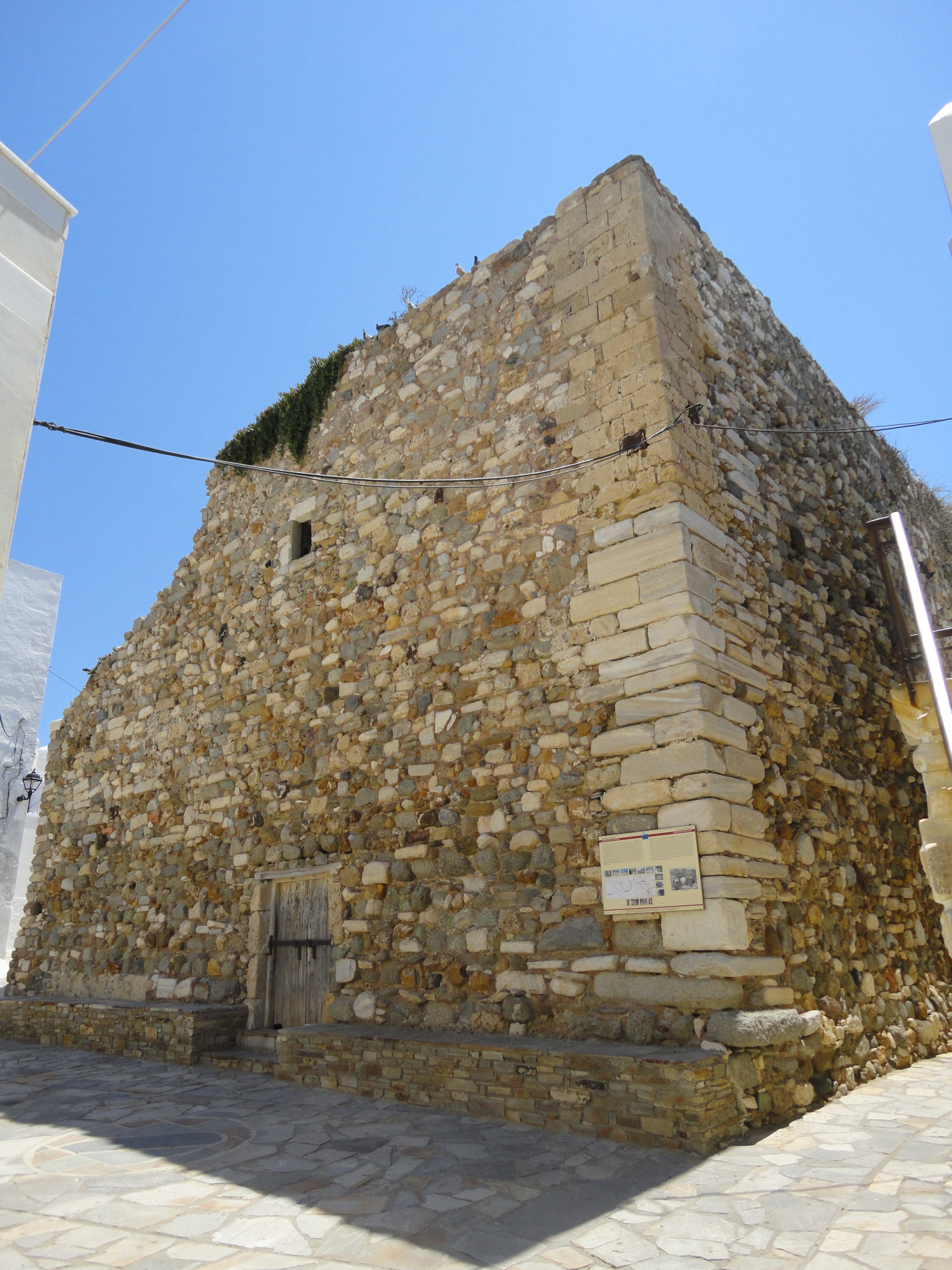
Tower of Sanudo

==== Nio Chorio ====
Nio Chorio (Greek: Νιό Χωριό, meaning 'New Village') is a district south of the Kastro, which was traditionally mainly inhabited by economically poorer peasants and laborers. It is located south & southwest of the castle, and contains mainly residential buildings, as well as some shops, restaurants and a number of churches. The streets of Nio Chorio are generally wider and less inclined than those at Bourgos, making them partly accessible to vehicles such as motorcycles or even cars to residents.

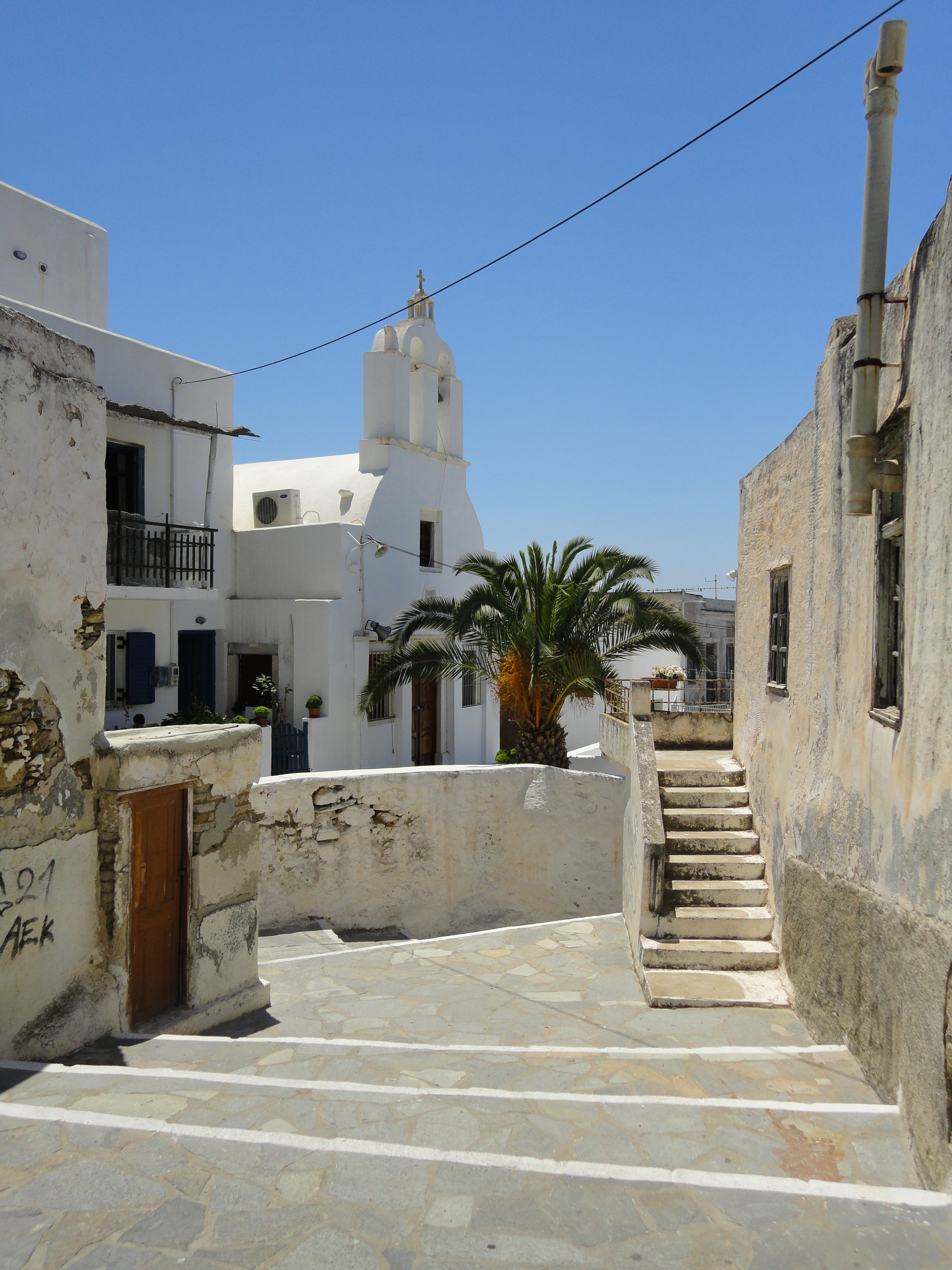
Church of St. Paraskevi in Nio Chorio

=== New Constructions ===
Mostly in the 20th century, the city underwent significant construction and expansion beyond its old borders.

==== City Expansion ====
New houses began to be built outside of the fortified Old Town around the beginning of the 20th century. A new district, called Prosfygika (Greek: Προσφυγικά, meaning 'refugee district') was added in the 1920s after a wave of Greek refugees from western Turkey arrived on Naxos following the 1922 Asia Minor Disaster. Development outside of the old city limits continued in the following decades due to people immigrating from the island's villages to the city, with a large wave of construction taking place in and after the 1970s with the rise of tourism. The city's development was mainly concentrated in an area south of the old town, delimited to its west by Agios Georgios Beach, and to its east by the road connecting the city to the villages. The newly built areas include asphalt roads in grid configurations, which are used for car traffic. All new buildings have been built in a style resembling the traditional construction found in the Old Town and elsewhere on the island, according to local building regulations.

==== Port and Promenade ====
The Port of Naxos is on the northwestern side of the city, and includes a breakwater and several piers. It facilitates transport of people and goods to and from the island by ferry, also providing a place to dock smaller vessels such as fishing boats. Along the seafront lies a promenade, known locally as Paralia (Greek: Παραλία, meaning 'seafront'). It consists of a pedestrian street lined with shops and restaurants (Protopapadaki Str.), an asphalt road for car traffic and an additional walking area by the sea. During the summer months, the asphalt road is closed for traffic during the night, instead also being accessible to pedestrians. A part of the promenade collapsed in 2023 and is still undergoing restoration as of 2025.

== Landmarks ==
The city includes a number of historical landmarks and areas of interest. Some of those are:

- The temple of Apollo (Also known as Portara): A large ancient marble gate of an unfinished temple from the 6th century BC. It is the most famous landmark of both the city and the entire island.
- The castle (known in Greek as Kastro), which contains landmarks including Glezos Tower, Sanudo Tower, the 'great gate' (Trani Porta) and the Catholic Cathedral of Naxos.
- The promenade (Paralia) and the old market.
- The beach of St. George (Agios Georgios).
- The Archaeological Museum of Naxos.
- The Orthodox Cathedral of Naxos. The square in front of the Cathedral has an underground 'In-Situ Museum', with remains of the ancient city.

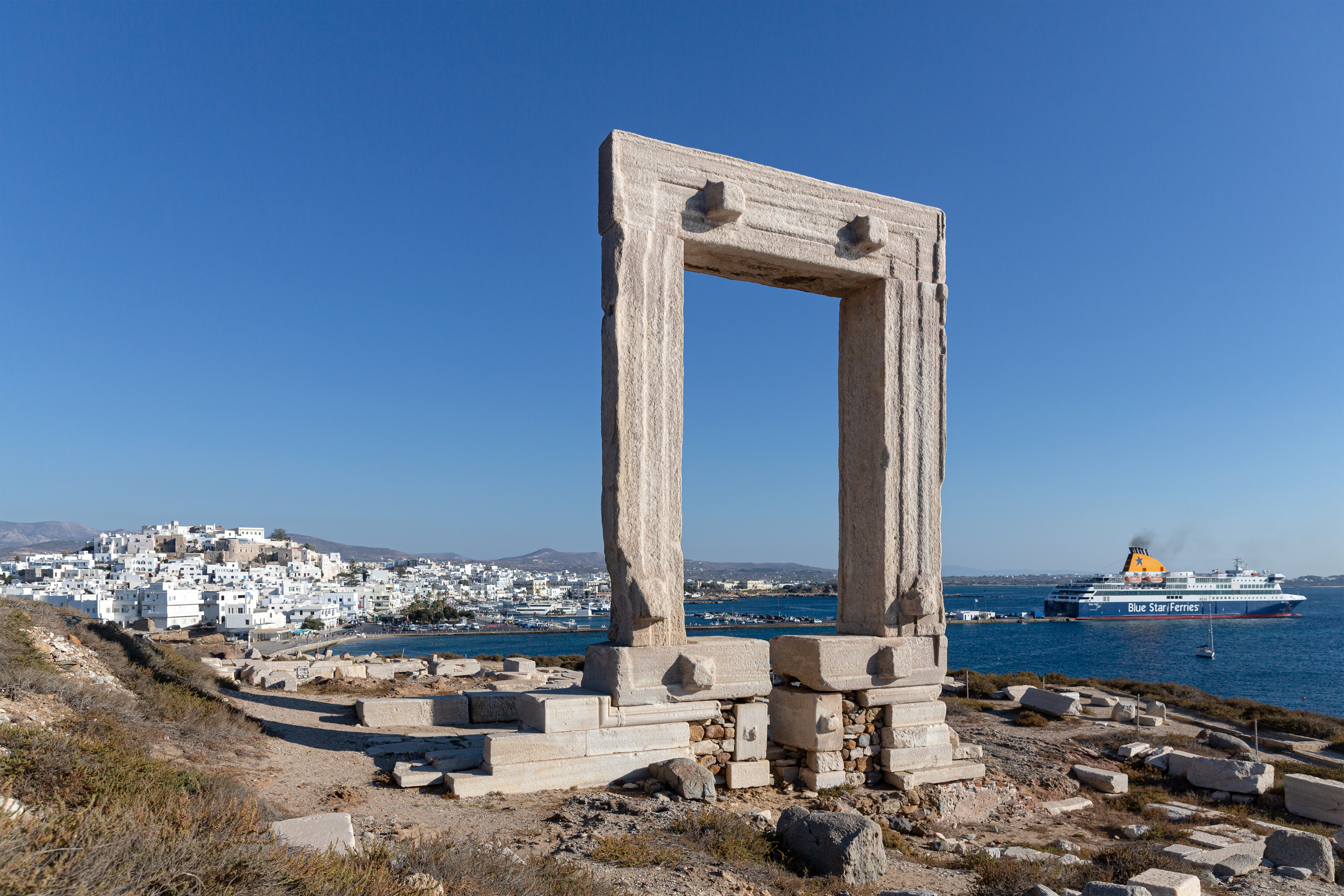
The temple of Apollo

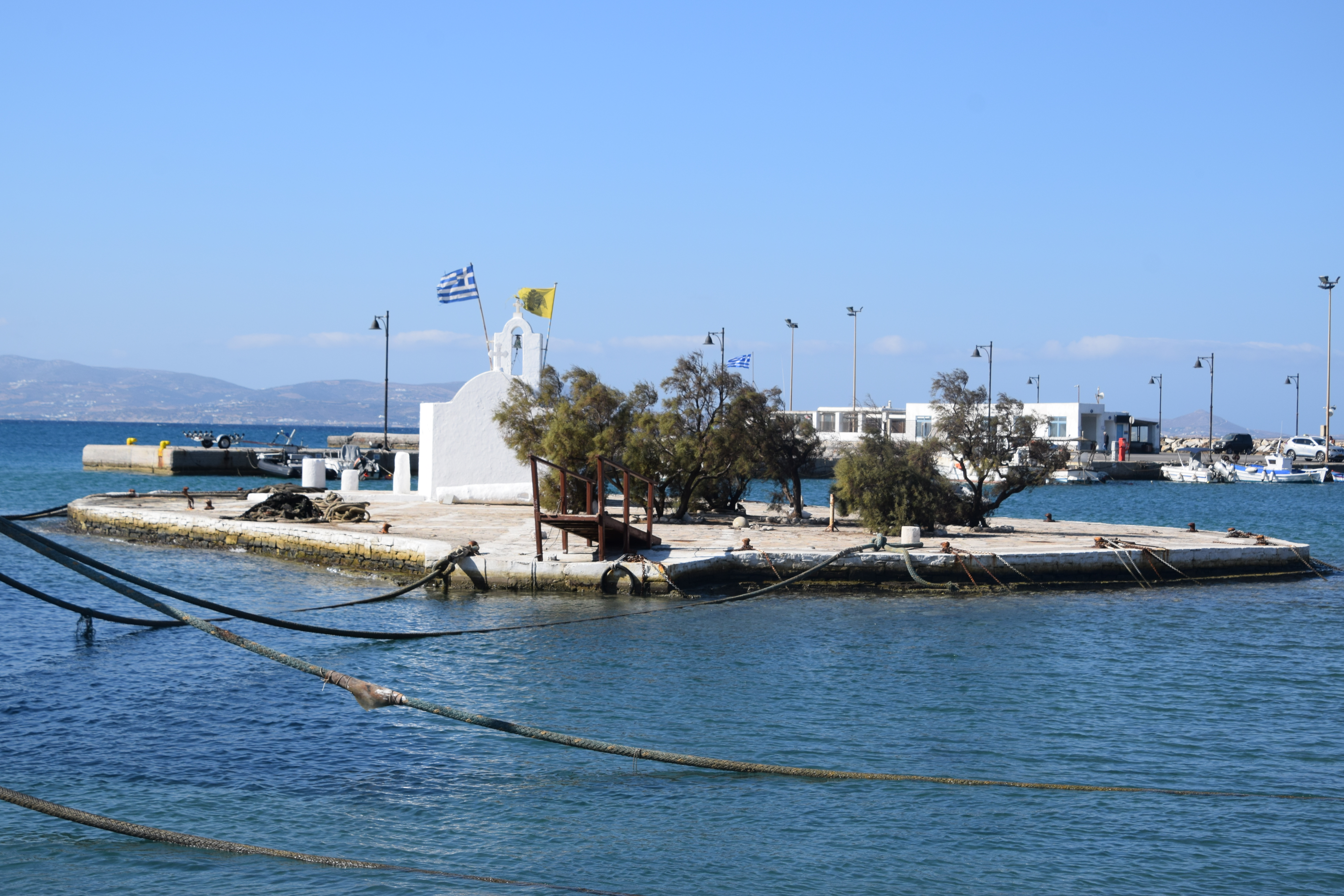
The church of Panagia Myrtidiotissa, located on a small islet by the port

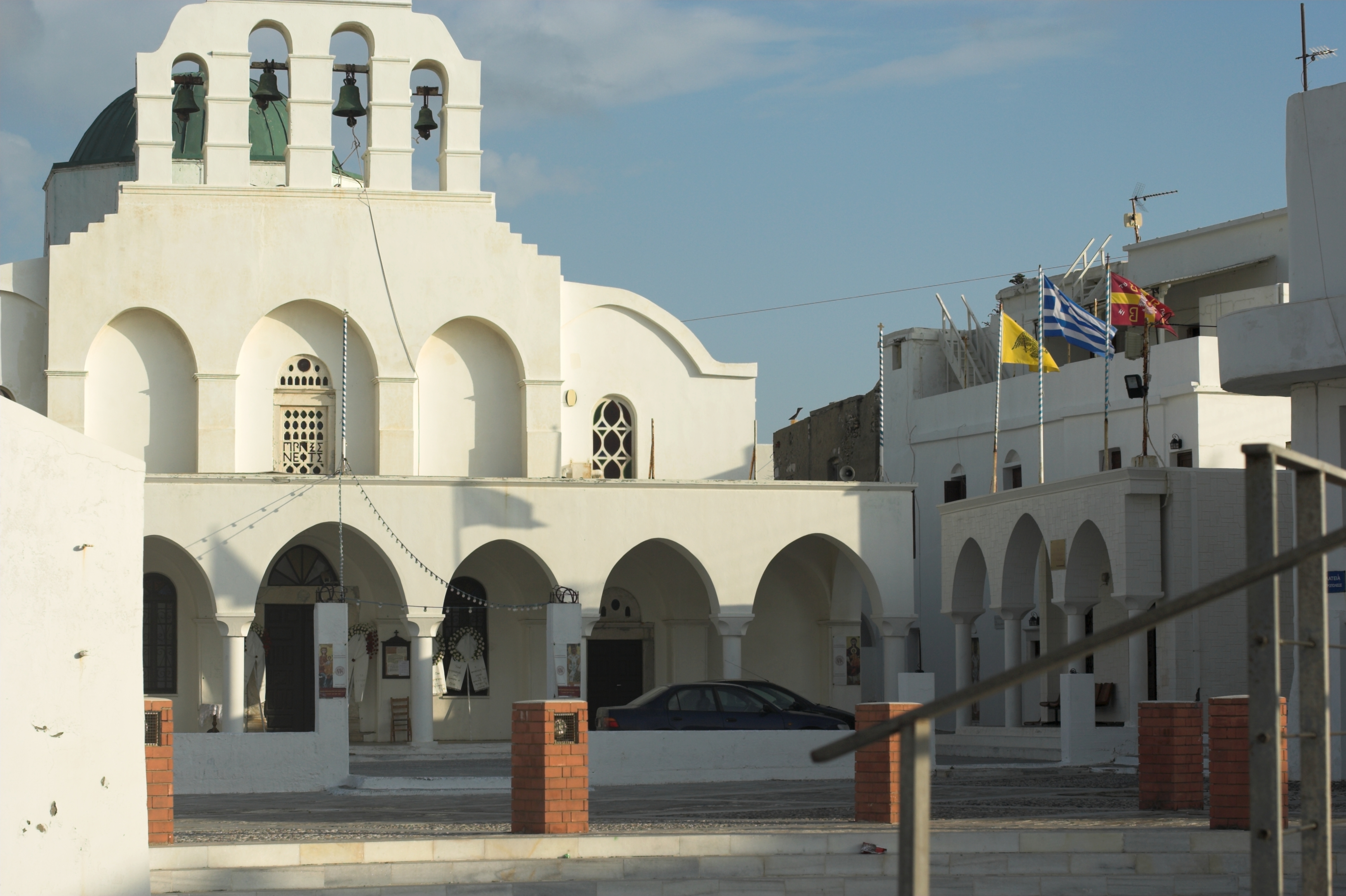
The Orthodox Cathedral

== Transportation and Infrastructure ==
=== Road Network ===
The city is connected by road to the villages and other parts of the island. The villages can be accessed by car, taxi (which can be found by the port) or intercity bus (KTEL), with the latter having more frequent schedules during the summer months. There are several municipal parking lots in the town, which can be used for free by both residents and visitors. The city faces significant traffic congestion, particularly during the summer months. With multiple daily ferries bringing in vehicles, traffic jams have become a frequent occurrence. Moreover, securing a parking spot can be challenging during peak hours. These issues have steadily worsened in recent years.

=== Ferry transport ===
Through its port, the town is connected by ferry to all neighboring islands and to the port of Piraeus at Athens, located at a distance of about 180 kilometers (100 nautical miles).

=== Air transport ===
The island's airport is located about 3 kilometers from the city center. The airport has daily flights to and from Athens International Airport. As of early 2025, the airport is undergoing a 17 million euro expansion plan. Starting in 2024 and 2025 respectively, new direct connections to Heraklion and Thessaloniki will be available.

=== Water ===
Water to the town is provided by some nearby dams. It is not pure enough to drink, and most residents make use of water filters or drink bottled water. In 2024, due to a many-year streak of low rainfall on the island, with water supplies running low, desalination plants were installed near the town hall.

=== Education ===
The town has a number of primary and secondary schools, as well as the only high school on the island.

=== Health ===
The town is served by one hospital, which is currently undergoing a 6.8 million euro expansion. Additionally, the town includes several clinics and doctor’s offices to address routine healthcare needs. For emergencies requiring advanced treatment, patients are transported to Athens by helicopter or ferry to receive specialized care.

== Sports ==
The town is home to the football club Pannaxiakos, which plays in the Gamma Ethniki, the third tier of the Greek football system and has won seven times in the Cyclades Cup and eight times in the Cyclades Championship. Sports-related infrastructure in the city includes gyms, football fields, basketball courts, and tennis courts.

== Culture ==
There are a number of yearly festivals and celebrations taking place in the town, including:

- The Naxos Carnival, a three-day event with parades involving costumes and torches.
- Religious celebrations, such as those of St. Nicodemus (14 July) and Panagia Chrysopolitissa (21st of November) which include parades and image processions.

== Cinema ==
Movies filmed in the town of Naxos include:

- Two Tickets to Greece
- Perimenontas ti Nona (Περιμένοντας τη Νονά)
- Testosteroni (Τεστοστερόνη)
- Tiger Zinda Hai: the last song of this movie, 'Swag Se Swagat' was filmed in the town of Naxos, and is currently the most liked Bollywood song on YouTube, with a combined 1.5 billion views and 6 million likes.

== Historical population ==
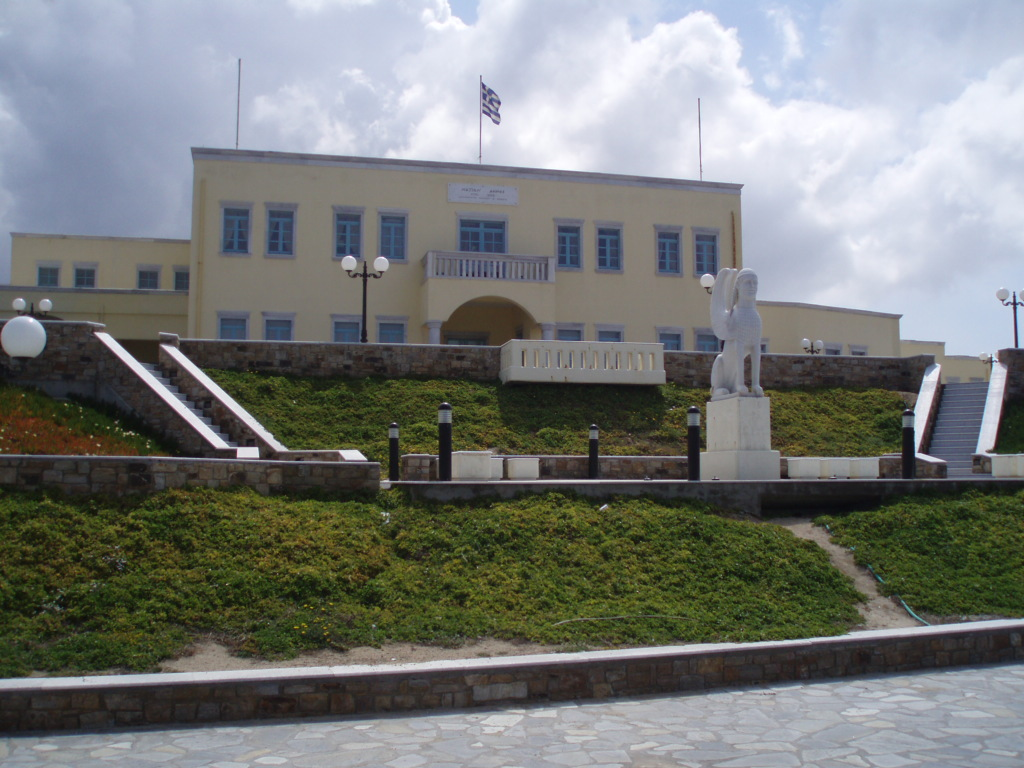
The town hall

The below values refer to the population of the Naxos municipality, which, besides the town itself, included about 30% of the island. The municipality was disestablished in 2011.

Year	Population
1991	9,824
2001	12,089
2011	12,726
2021	14,708

== Notable people ==
- Kostas Manolas (born 1991), footballer
