= Isthmia (sanctuary) =

- Ἴσθμια (Greek)
- Location within Greece
- 37°54′57.3372″N 22°59′35.4084″E
- Type: Sanctuary
- Periods: Archaic period-Late Antiquity
- Satellite of: Corinth
- Location: Kyras Vrysi, Corinthia, Greece
- Region: Corinthia

History
- Built: 690 to 650 BC

Site notes
- Archaeologists: Oscar Broneer; Elizabeth Gebhard; Timothy Gregory

Isthmia was an ancient sanctuary of Poseidon on the territory of the ancient city-state of Corinth and located on the Isthmus of Corinth in Greece. It was famous in antiquity for the Isthmian Games and its Temple of Poseidon. Today it is an important archaeological site with museum.

== Location ==
Isthmia is located on the key land route connecting Athens and central Greece with Corinth and the Peloponnese. Its location on the Isthmus, between the major Corinthian ports of Lechaeum on the Gulf of Corinth and Cenchreae on the Saronic Gulf, made Isthmia a natural site for the worship of Poseidon, god of the sea and also of mariners. Isthmia sits on a very active fault line, and Poseidon's role as "Earth-holder" in causing and averting earthquakes is another reason Isthmia became the center of athletic and religious festivals in his honor. The Games at Isthmia were second in significance only to those at Olympia.

== History ==
=== Prehistoric times ===
Stone artifacts found on the site have been dated and indicate that humans have inhabited Corinthia since the Neolithic Era. Small samples of pottery dating to the last era of the Bronze Age (1600-1200 BC) show that people were still living in Isthmia during this time. During the Greek Dark Ages, the population declined throughout Greece, and with it came a deterioration of material wealth in Isthmia.

=== Archaic and classical periods ===
As Greece moved into the Archaic period, writing, material culture, and population all increased. The people of Isthmia began constructing large stone monuments and religious sanctuaries. In the year 481 BC, the Persian Empire attempted to invade Greece. Isthmia was not a major battlefield, but its central location made it a preferred site for Greek conferences and pre–battle meetings. The Archaic temple at Isthmia was badly burned in a fire in 480 BC, and the Doric-style temple remains were repaired using Classical architecture style elements.

In 390 BC, during the Corinthian War, the Spartan king Agesilaus encamped at the sanctuary and the archaic temple of Poseidon was burned down in uncertain circumstances. The lack of pottery found at the site after the fire indicates that Isthmia entered a period of decreased prosperity at this time.

After Philip II, King of Macedon won the Battle of Chaeronea in 338 BC, he united the Greek city-states into the League of Corinth, which was formed at a council at Isthmia. Philip's successor, Alexander the Great called a meeting in Isthmia between the Greek city–states to discuss his war with Persia. During the Wars of the Diadochi after Alexander's death, several successors tried to use Isthmia as a central place in short-lived attempts to unify the Greeks under their control - first Ptolemy I in 308 BC and then Demetrius Poliorcetes, who refounded the League of Corinth at Isthmia in 302 BC.

=== Roman period ===
A permanent settlement was established on the Rachi hill to the south of the temple at the end of the fourth century BC. This settlement lasted until it was destroyed by the Roman Republic in 198 BC, during the Second Macedonian War. After the Romans defeated Macedon in that war, Titus Quinctius Flamininus declared the "Freedom of the Greeks" at Isthmia, cementing the location's status as a symbol of Greek unity and freedom.

In 146 BC, rising tensions between the Greek states and the increasingly hegemonic Romans resulted in a last attempt by the Achaean League to maintain its independence. The Achaean War ended in a quick Roman victory, and consul Lucius Mummius Achaicus ordered the complete destruction of Corinth as an example to all Greeks. The sanctuary was destroyed and control of the Isthmian Games was transferred to Sicyon.

The Isthmian Games were returned to Corinth after its refoundation as a Roman colony by Julius Caesar in 44 BC. However, it appears that the games were held in Corinth itself and there is little evidence for activity at Isthmia until the mid-first century AD. The Emperor Nero visited the site on his tour of Greece in AD 67 and performed in the musical events at the Isthmian Games. A new round of construction in the second century AD was presided over by the local aristocrat, Licinius Priscus Juventianus.

=== Late Antique, Medieval, and Early Modern periods ===
The Temple of Poseidon fell into disuse and its material was partly re-used for the building of the Hexamilion wall which was used as protection against invading barbarians in the 5th century.

The Ottoman Empire captured Isthmia in 1423, and permanently in 1458. Isthmia was fought over by the Turks, Venetians, and local potentates for over three centuries. In 1715, the Venetians were expelled, and the Ottoman Empire controlled southern Greece for a hundred years until the Greek War of Independence.

=== Excavations ===
The temple was originally found by Oscar Broneer in 1952 and he then led excavations funded by the University of Chicago which continued until 1967. He excavated the temple, theater, two caves used for dining, and the two stadia used for the Isthmian Games. Broneer's findings were published in a series of three volumes starting in 1971, and in articles in the Hesperia Journal.

Elizabeth Gebhard took over management of the University of Chicago finds from Oscar Broneer in 1976. Between August 16 and November 29, 1989, she led new excavations in the central area of the sanctuary under the auspices of the University of Chicago, mostly to clear up disputes that had arisen over the conclusions Broneer had drawn from his finds. The first report of the 1989 findings was published in Hesperia in 1992, with subsequent reports following in later years. These excavations helped to uncover evidence relating to all the areas of development of Isthmia from the Bronze Age to the Roman period, but in particular focused on the Archaic temple, partly because this is the most complete of the buildings found at the site despite being one of the oldest.

From 1967, a second set of excavations were undertaken on the northern and eastern parts of the site, led by Paul A. Clement and funded by UCLA. He was succeeded by Timothy E. Gregory of Ohio State University in 1987, who was himself succeeded by Jon Frey of Michigan State University in 2020. These excavations focussed largely on the Roman bathing complex and the Byzantine fortress.

== Monuments ==
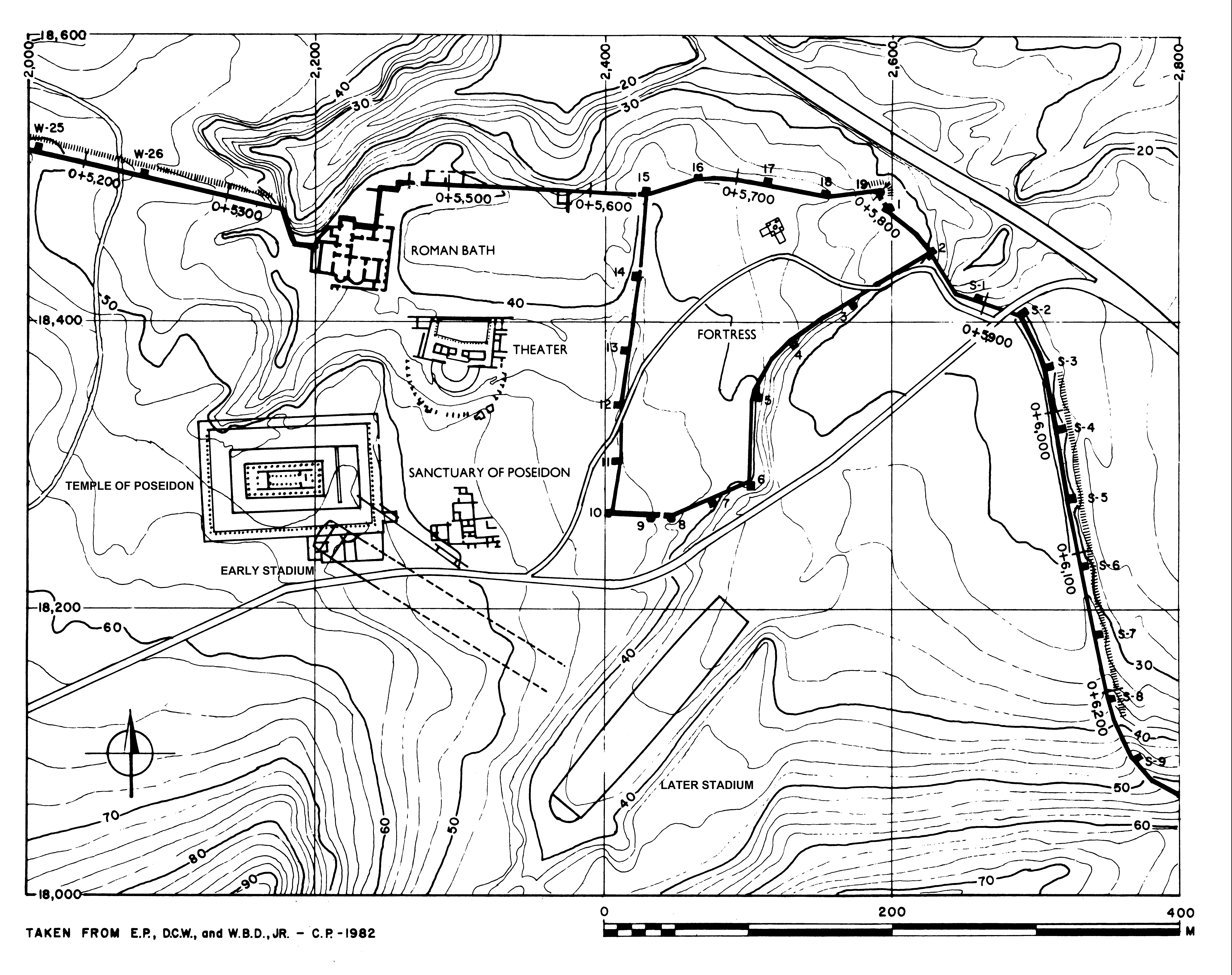
Site Plan of Sanctuary of Poseidon at Isthmia

=== Temples ===
The Archaic Temple of Poseidon, which was excavated in 1952 by Oscar Broneer, was built in the Doric style in 700 BC. The temple was constructed on a plateau, surrounded by valleys and considered the center of the Isthmian sanctuaries. The temple also housed shrines to gods related to Poseidon such as his son, Cyclopes, and the goddess Demeter. A multitude of other named divinities said to have been worshipped within the confines of the temple have links to Demeter, suggesting the Isthmian people's devotion to fertility and harvest. Evidence including plates, bowls, and animal bones discovered within the ash on the plateau suggest that animal sacrifices of sheep, cattle, and goats took place at the temple on a regular basis and were often a cause for feasting and celebration.

When it burned in 480 BC, the roof, Sima (architecture), and columns were replaced using Classical style building elements. There was also a temple built for the god Apollo. Because of the similarities in construction style and building materials between these temples, it can be concluded that they were completed within two generations of building. Isthmia was also home to a Roman temple that was built for the worship of Palaimon. The Temple to Palaimon was decorated with roof ornaments of the Ionic Order.

=== Roman Bath ===
The Roman Baths at Isthmia lay on the north edge of the sanctuary. The plan of this bath, which follows a “ring” configuration, consists of several rooms, each with unique purposes. The Roman order of bathing during this time was warm to hot to cold, which was followed in the bath's plan. This order was a recommendation among doctors at the time for healing regimens.

Entrance to the baths were in rooms I, VII, or XII, which served as places for undressing, socializing, or as massage rooms. This was followed by hot bathing in halls IX, XI, and XIII. The caldaria or heated rooms featured hypocaust heating with hot pools along the shorter sides. Deeper plunge pools were located in the frigidarium (rooms III, IV and V).

Room VI, also known as the Great Hall, is one of the most significant rooms in the bath. In this room, excavators found a large monochromatic mosaic that covered nearly the entire floor. According to Timothy E. Gregory, this is the largest monochrome mosaic excavated in the eastern Mediterranean and is one of the most important works of art found at Isthmia. The mosaic is divided into 3 sections, with two containing geometric designs and one showing similar images of Greek Tritons carrying Nereids on their backs. The mosaic had been damaged in antiquity and was in need of restoration. This was done by lifting the mosaic completely from the ground, cleaning debris from the bottom, and replacing it back in its original position.

In the 5th century AD, the north and northwest corners of the bath were incorporated into the Hexamilion wall.

=== Theater ===
The Theater at Isthmia lies on a slope 80 meters northeast of the Temple of Poseidon. Excavations led by Elizabeth Gebhard and Oscar Broneer in 1959, 1960, and 1967 found evidence for a structure that was built in the classical period and was renovated at several later points in time.

The theater was constructed during the 5th century B.C. Excavations discovered that initially it consisted of a hollow that served as seating for spectators arranged around an orchestra. Gebhard has argued that the cavea of the 5th century was partly polygonal rather than semicircular.

Near the end of the 4th century B.C, the theater was remodeled with an enlarged semicircular seating area but the absence of seat foundations from this period prevented excavators from finding evidence of stairway restorations. Gebhard estimates that 1,550 spectators could fit in the lower level alone, with more room on the slope above the cavea. The scene building at this time stood at the north edge of the theater on the opposite side of the orchestra and had the same general plan of the skene from the first theater. Foundations at the orchestra level remain from the second phase, and blocks from the first, second and third courses are standing.

This configuration of the theater remained unchanged through the later Hellenistic period and the period of abandonment that followed the sack of Corinth.

Following a lengthy period of abandonment of the site, a new phase of the theater began at the end of the 1st century A.D. when control of the sanctuary had passed to the Romans. Major changes were made at this time, including new beddings for seat blocks, a reshaped orchestra, and a new upper section for more seating. Despite the advance deterioration of the wooden scene building from the Greek periods, Romans chose to use what was left of it and incorporate it into their renovations.

The second and final reconstruction of the theater occurred during the second half of the 2nd century A.D. The cavea's lower section remained undisturbed, but an incomplete effort was made to expand the upper section of seating. In the area of the orchestra near the scene building, a set of two ionic columns were constructed. It is believed that these columns would have supported statues such as emperors and their family members. The unusual location of these columns suggests that the theater was primarily used for only one or two performers at once. During the second Roman period, the space north of the scene building was used to construct a large courtyard. Due to the existing structures surrounding the area, this court was laid out in a trapezoidal shape.

=== Stadiums ===
When the Isthmian Games were founded in 582 BC, the people of Isthmia built a stadium for the sporting activities. The stadium was rebuilt in the Hellenistic period and featured a racetrack. Two stadiums have been discovered at the site-the first is associated with the establishment of the Isthmian Games in 582 BC and the second is built during the Hellenistic period. These have been termed the Early Stadium and the Late Stadium respectively

==== Early Stadium ====
The Early Stadium is located to the immediate southeast of the temple of Poseidon and features water channels, a well preserved starting line, and the remains of an artificial embankment along the northern side of the track that once allowed spectators to observe the contests. The water channel surrounded the outer perimeter of the running track and flowed through two basins on opposite sides of the starting line. It was supplied with freshwater that was brought in through gaps in the walls surrounding the space. More interesting still is the complex starting line mechanism that was designed to ensure a fair start for footraces. This mechanism takes the form of a triangular pavement with sockets cut to take a row of upright posts that flank the sixteen lanes of the racetrack. A series of straight shallow grooves extend from these sockets to a single round cutting at the apex of the pavement that served as the starter’s position. The upright posts held a horizontal piece of wood attached to a string, which could be manipulated to swing down to vertical at the desire of the starter. This unique system may not have functioned as intended and was quickly replaced by more practical starting methods that relied on a single barrier stretched in front of all the runners.

==== Late Stadium ====
The late stadium remains unexcavated, but was explored briefly in the 1950s. It was constructed in a nearby streambed with stream was diverted to flow underneath the floor of the track. Covered with several feet of eroded soil and containing a grove of trees on one end, the stadium has proven a challenge to uncover safely, but the limited excavations provide a decent picture of the late stadium and its elements.

Many of the discovered elements are well preserved, and it is possible to restore the racetrack, water channels, and spectator seating. The racetrack does not contain any indication of hard surfacing, which is different from the early stadium and its use of white earth.The water channels that flank the track are lined with hard stucco material, and shows the change of influence from Greek to Roman as parts were added. Basins were spaced along this channel and likely served to store larger amounts of water. Some parts of this water system had paintings of marine animals, possibly a tribute to Poseidon. Rising up on either side of the racetrack are steps cut into the bank, which were likely used as seats for spectators. Overall, the planning and placement of the Late Stadium show deeper thought and care than those of the Early Stadium, but both provide examples of the cultural significance of sport in culture at this time.

=== The East Field ===
On the eastern side of the temple there is a field with excavated remains of small buildings, most likely houses, that had water facilities and food preparation areas.

== Culture ==
Isthmia's temples and stadiums highlight its religious, athletic, and political past. The first evidence of religious rituals, however, comes before the erection of the monumental sanctuary. In the Early Iron Age, cup and bowl fragments were found on the south-east side of the central plateau. They dated to the proto–geometric period and were surrounded by burnt bones that belonged to goats, sheep, and other animals sacrificed to Poseidon. Beginning in the late 8th century, evidence of a more defined sanctuary space is made with the construction of an altar and Temenos walls. Vessels made of both cheap and luxurious materials were found at this site. This suggests that the common people of Isthmia, not just the rich, were worshiping at the temple. The differences in the material quality of the vessels found at the site also suggests societal separation based on rank.

The first appearance of ceramic evidence suggestive of cult activirty dates to the 11th century BC. Vessels and pots from different time periods continued to be found at the site, suggesting that religious rituals for the people of Isthmia were continuous and long-lasting.

In other archaeological excavations, 30 graves containing the remains of 69 people were found. The bodies have been dated to come from different time periods and are spread throughout the areas of excavation, suggesting that habitation in Isthmia was widespread and deep-rooted. The bodies are also buried using a variety of mortuary ritual processes, showing that Isthmia was an enduring, developing community.

== Interactive Tour ==
As part of an effort to improve accessibility to the site, a virtual tour of the sanctuary and monuments has been created. https://my.matterport.com/show/?m=7xo2mLxwijs&ss=685&sr=-.5,-.81
