= Oscar Broneer =

Swedish American educator and archaeologist

Oscar Theodore Broneer (December 28, 1894 – February 22, 1992) was a prominent Swedish American educator and archaeologist known in particular for his work on Ancient Greece. He is most associated with his discovery of the Temple of Isthmia, an important Panhellenic shrine dating from the seventh century B.C.

== Biography ==
Broneer was born in the parish of Bäckebo in Kalmar County, Sweden. Broneer was the youngest son of a rural farm family. He left Sweden in 1913 for the United States. He first studied at Augustana College and then attended the University of California, Berkeley where it took Broneer only two years to earn both an M.A. and Ph.D. Broneer was professor of archaeology, classical languages and literature at the University of Chicago from 1949 until his retirement in 1960. He also served as director of the university excavations at Isthmia. Additionally he held visiting professorships at the University of California at Los Angeles and Stanford University.

Broneer taught at the American School of Classical Studies at Athens and worked for years at the Corinth Excavations, under the direction of T. Leslie Shear. In the late 1930s, he worked in Northern Greece and described the re-erection of the monumental Lion of Amphipolis in the book The Lion of Amphipolis published in 1941. He returned to an impoverished Greece after the end of World War II as a member of the International Red Cross. In 1947, he also directed Triumph Over Time, a documentary short film issued as a fundraiser by the American School of Classical Studies in Athens. While working at Corinth he also developed the first systematic typology of ancient terracotta lamps.

In 1952, Broneer famously discovered the temple of Poseidon at Isthmia on the very first day of the excavation. He published his findings in a series of three volumes: Isthmia, Vol. 1, Temple of Poseidon (1971), Isthmia, Vol. 2, Topography and Architecture (1973) and Isthmia, Vol. 3, Terracotta Lamps (1977). Broneer became the field director at Isthmia in 1952 and remained in charge until 1967. He died in Corinth, Greece and was buried in Hagia Anna cemetery beside his first wife, Verna Anderson, who died in 1948. The papers of Oscar Broneer are maintained at the American School of Classical Studies at Athens

== Honors ==
In 1962, the Greek government honored him with the honorary command of the Royal Hellenic Order of the Phoenix. He received the Gold Medal of the Archaeological Institute of America in 1969. He was honorary vice president of the Archaeological Association of Greece and an honorary member of the International Olympic Committee. He was awarded membership in the German Archaeological Institute and the Royal Swedish Academy of Letters, History and Antiquities.

== Selected works ==
- A critical interpretation of Plato's Republic, II 357A-362C (1922)
- Corinth IV, ii: Terracotta Lamps (1930)
- Corinth X: The Odeum (1932)
- Acrocorinth: excavations in 1926 (1930)
- Corinth I, iv: The South Stoa and Its Roman Successors (1954)

Note: His full bibliography can be found in Hesperia: The Journal of the American School of Classical Studies at Athens Volume 43, Issue 4 (1974).

== Gallery ==
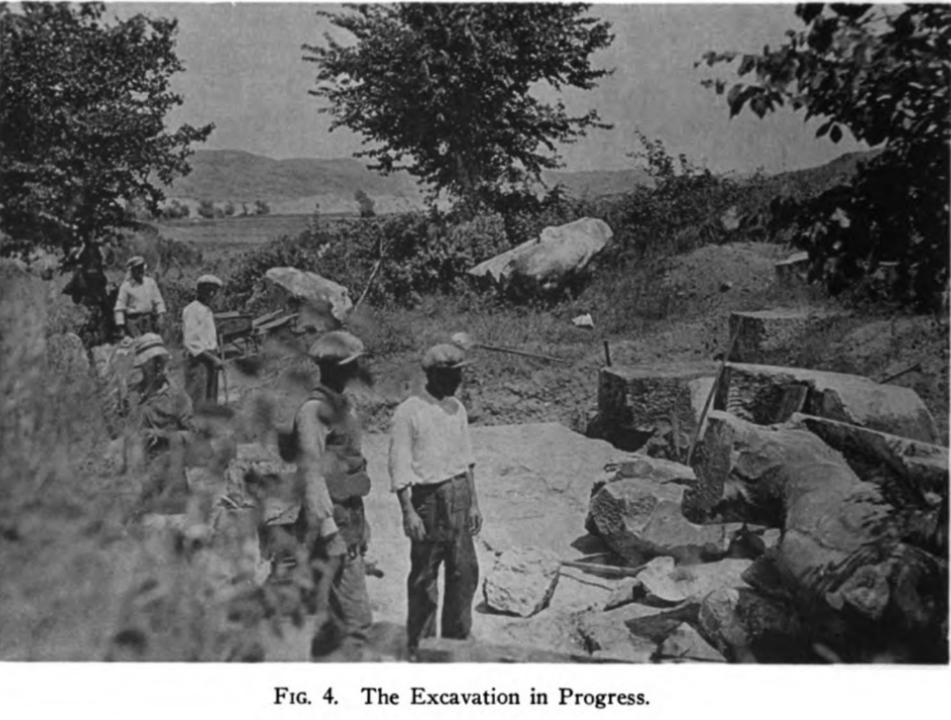
Early excavations for the Lion of Amphipolis

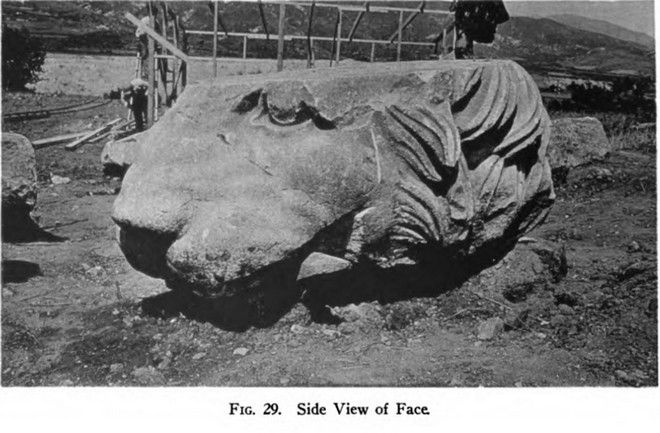
Part of the lion's head before restoration

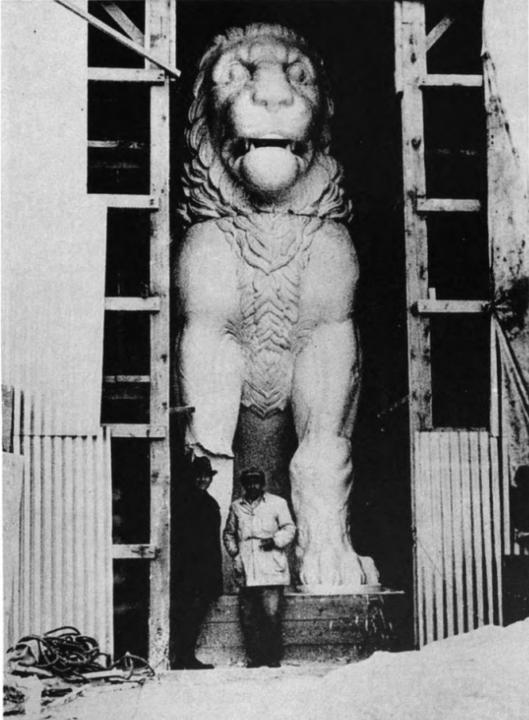
The imposing size of the lion in an early picture following its restoration

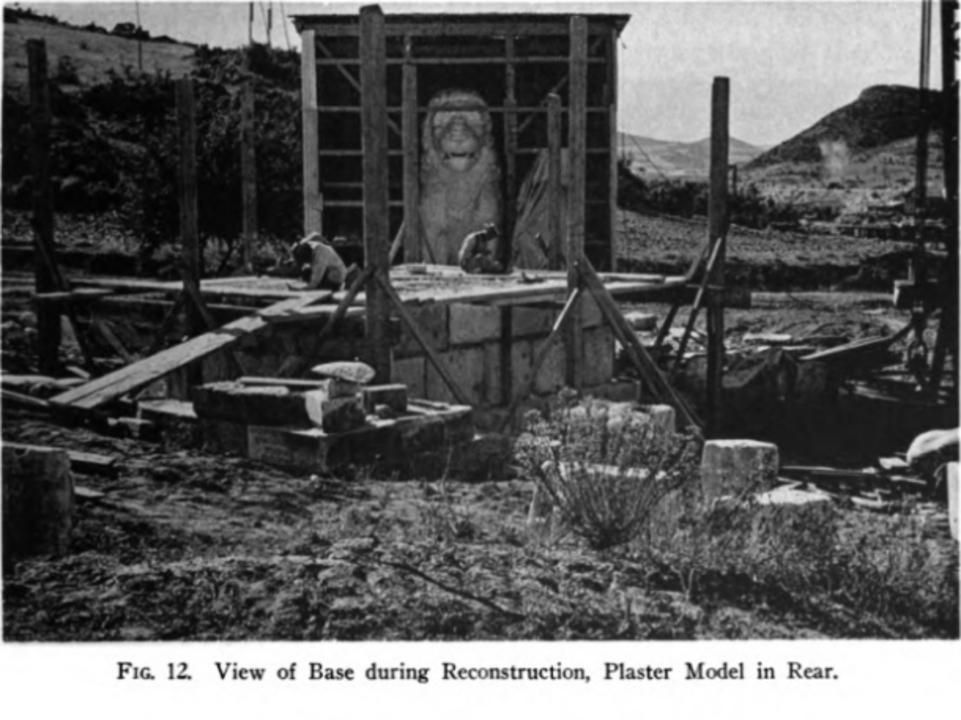
View of the base during reconstruction

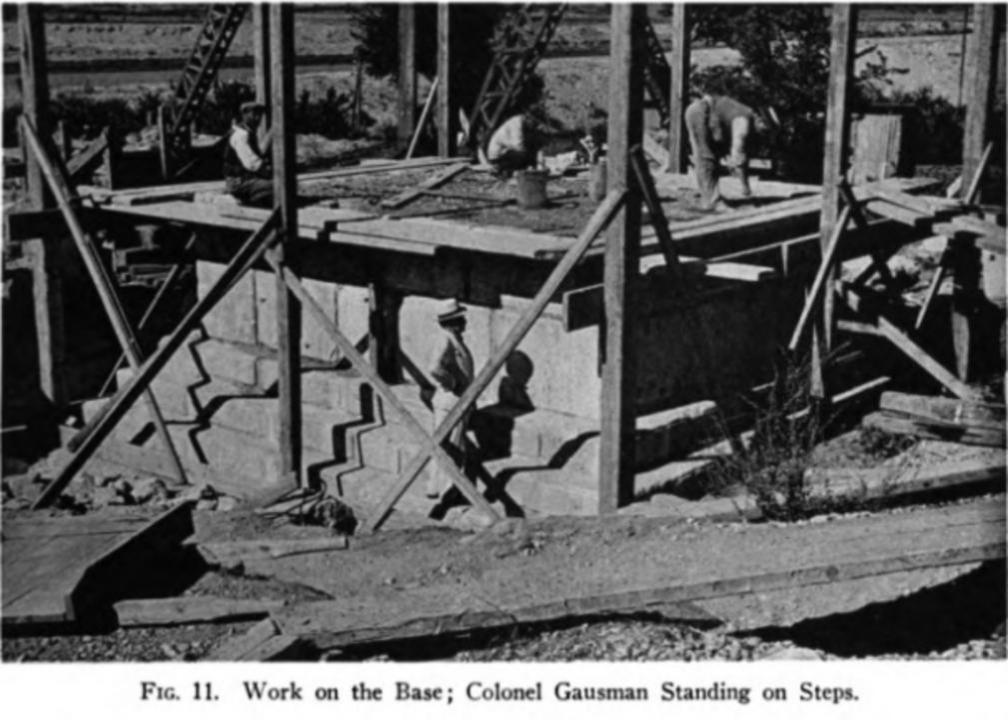
Works conducted on the lion's base

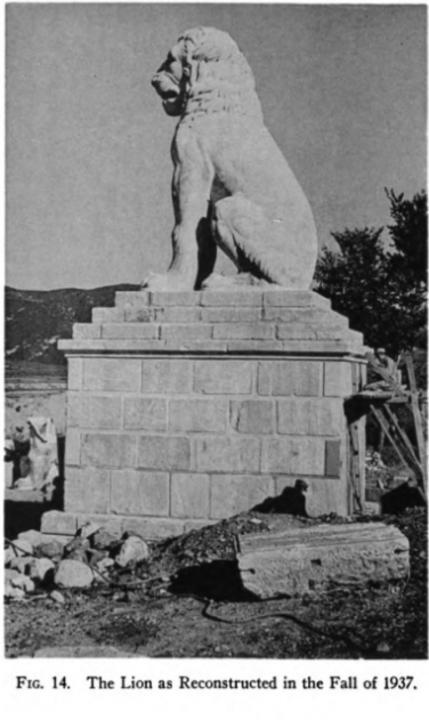
Reconstructed statue in 1937

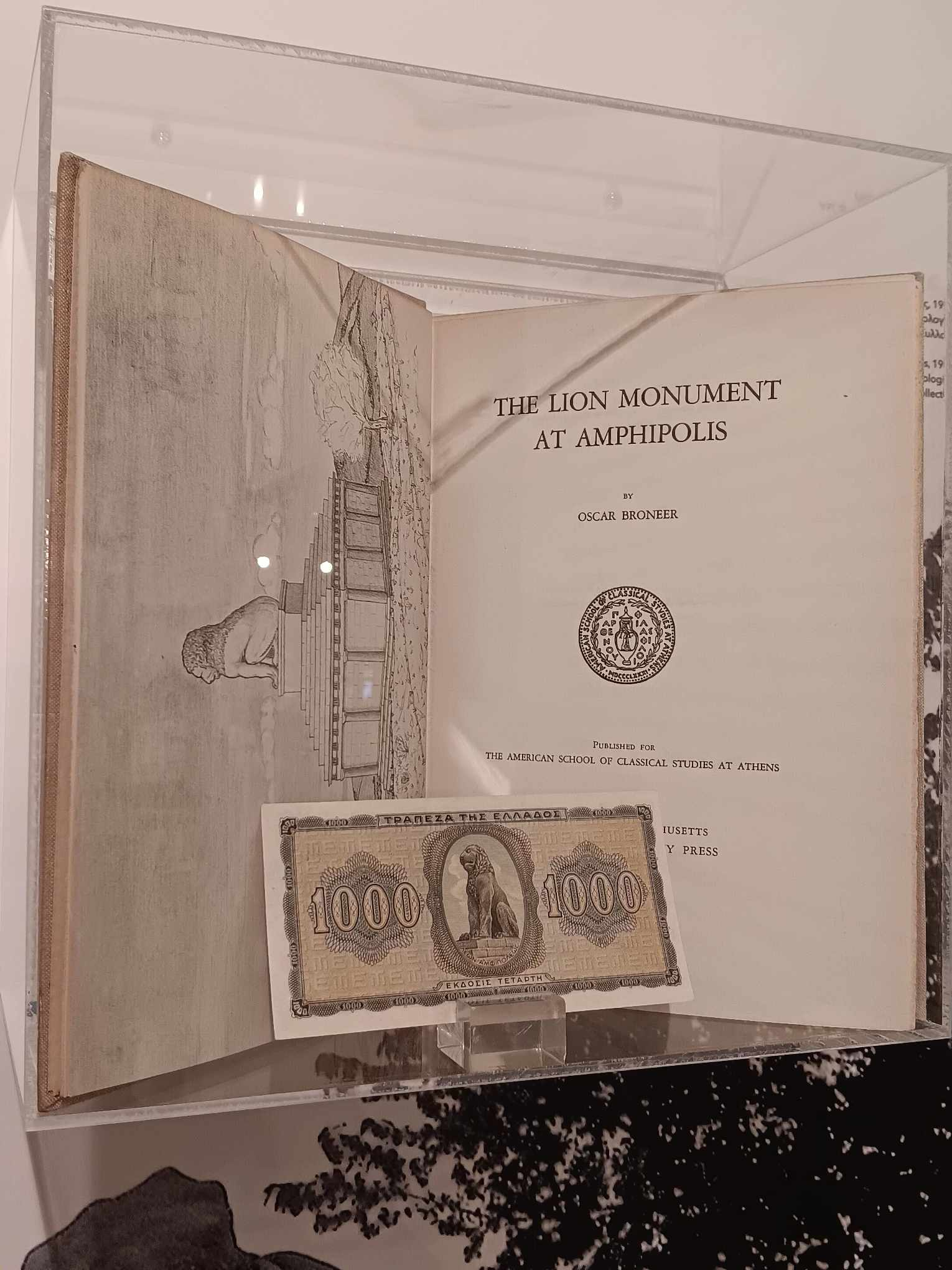
A copy of Broneer's Lion of Amphipolis book and a 1942 Greek 1000 drachma banknote depicting the lion

== See also ==
- Ancient Corinth
