= Hexamilion wall =

Ancient defensive wall in Corinth, Greece

Hexamilion Wall
- Εξαμίλιον τείχος (Greek)
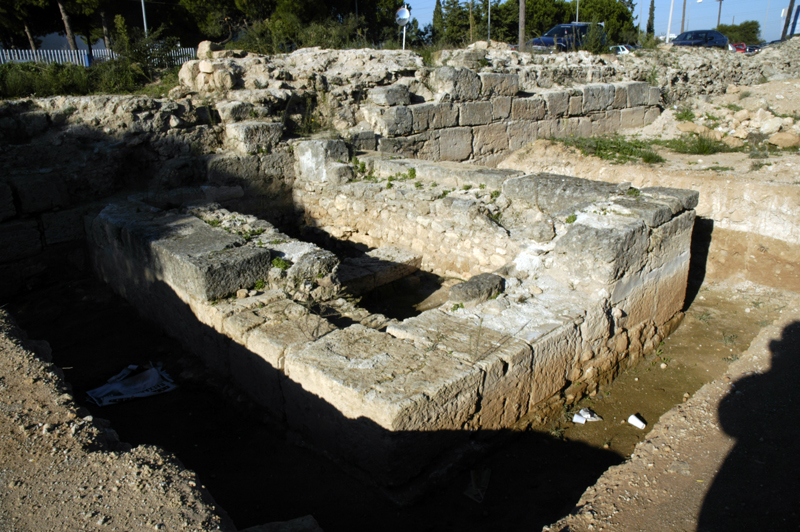
- A preserved portion of the wall with the base of a tower.

- Location within Greece
- 37°55′34″N 22°58′21″E
- Type: Defensive wall
- Periods: Early Medieval to Late Medieval
- Location: Corinth, Corinthia, Greece
- Region: Corinthia

Site notes
- Condition: Ruined
- Owner: Public
- Management: 25th Ephorate of Byzantine Antiquities
- Public access: Yes
- Website: Hellenic Ministry for Culture and Tourism

The Hexamilion wall (Greek: Εξαμίλιον τείχος, "six-mile wall") was a defensive wall constructed across the Isthmus of Corinth, guarding the only land route onto the Peloponnese peninsula from mainland Greece. It was constructed between AD 408 and 450, under the reign of Theodosius II.

== History ==
=== Early fortifications ===
The Hexamilion stands at the most recent end of a long series of attempts to fortify the isthmus stretching back to perhaps the Mycenaean period. Many of the Peloponnesian cities wanted to pull back and fortify the isthmus instead of making a stand at Thermopylae when Xerxes invaded in 480 BC (Herodotus' Histories 7.206). The issue arose again before the Battle of Salamis (Herodotos 8.40, 49, 56). Although the concept of a "Fortress Peloponnese" had been repeatedly suggested, fortification of the isthmus was of no utility without control of the sea, as Herodotus notes (7.138).

=== The Hexamilion and its history ===
The wall was constructed from AD 408 and 450, in the reign of Theodosius II during the time of the great Barbarian invasions into the Roman Empire. Its purpose was to protect the Peloponnese from invasion from the north. The attack of Alaric on Greece in 396 or the sack of Rome in 410 by the Visigoths may have motivated its construction. The wall ran from the Gulf of Corinth to the Saronic Gulf, covering a distance of 7,028 and 7,760 meters. The fortress contained two gates (north and south), of which the northern gate functioned as the formal entrance to the Peloponnese. In the reign of Justinian, the wall was fortified with additional towers, reaching a total number of 153, with forts at either end and the construction of Justinian's Fortress at Isthmia. The building of the Fortress at Isthmia was left mostly to autonomous work crews that, while following the same general instructions and using the same materials, operated in markedly different ways. As for the wall itself, local Corinthians – irrespective of politics or religion – would have contributed to the physical construction of the Hexamilion and the maintenance of any associated garrisons. Military use appears to have fallen off after the 7th century, and by the 11th century domestic structures were being built into the wall.

=== Characteristics of the wall ===
The strategic fortress of Isthmia, taking advantage of favorable terrain, was located to the southern side of the Hexamilion wall, north-east of the Poseidon Sanctuary. The wall was constructed with a rubble and mortar core faced with squared stones. The blocks on the northern facade were larger and coalesced with more carefully implemented edges, while the southern face was conceived of smaller stones set in mortar. It is not certain how long it took to complete, but the importance given to the task is apparent from the scale of the construction; the Hexamilion is the largest archaeological structure in Greece. Due to the great mass of the 7.5 km long wall (which was 7m high and 3m thick) many structures in the region were cannibalized for stone for the effort. Some structures were incorporated into the wall directly (as was the temple of Poseidon at Isthmia) whereas some were burned into lime (as was the sanctuary of Hera at Perachora, as well as much of the ancient statuary of Corinth). Materials from the Sanctuary of Poseidon were evenly distributed and converted into the main entrance of the wall in an emplecton building technique in the first century. Spolia (voussoirs, column drums, and inscribed blocks) were incorporated into both the structure and roadway. The fortress was intimately tied into the defensive network, a fact readily demonstrated by similarities in construction techniques used. The fortress consisted of nineteen rectangular towers protruding from the walls of its 2.7-hectare total area, and more than likely housed the military garrison that defended the Hexamilion as a whole. The main passageway through the wall was through the Isthmia fortress, where the north-east gate acted as the main entrance into the Peloponnese.

It is likely that the fortifications were damaged severely by earthquakes, which contributed to the rapid deterioration of the wall between renovations during Justinian and Manuel II's reigns. Most damaging was perhaps the earthquake of 551, which Procopius mentions as being particularly destructive to Greece as a whole.

=== Garrison ===
The garrison of the fortress of Isthmia in the 5th century likely consisted of four to eight tagmata. Historians believe the quality and state of the troops were similar to that of Procopius' descriptions of the state of the soldiers that manned the fortification at Thermopylae prior to Justinian’s reign; namely, local farmers who proved to be incapable of checking the advance of various invaders and so were replaced by comitatenses. As part of his repairs to the wall, Justinian established a professional military garrison within the Fortress of Isthmia, which replaced the local farmers who previously manned it.

To bolster supplies, the soldiers produced some of their own food through farming south of the Hexamilion, although major aid came also from local farmers, merchants, artisans, and workmen, including from other nearby towns, such as Corinth. A system of rural villas supplied a considerable share of goods and services also; such villae rusticae being an important part of the economic exchange system of the Empire, and a basic productive unit of Late Roman and Early Byzantine times. The variety of skilled labor contributed by the Hexamilion garrison allowed for the creation of local granaries, allowing for intensified economic exploitation of the region. Despite this growth in developmental pace, the demands on the countryside and local economy fluctuated seasonally, with a notable intensification of economic activity during the warmer seasons. Likewise, the garrison's presence strained both the environment and local economy during the off-season, when their skills were not in use. This created a cyclical local economy based on the presence of troops, where demand and production were in constant flux.

=== Effects on the locals ===
During its initial construction, the Hexamilion significantly restricted the number of passages into the Peloponnese. The road from Athens was made to pass directly through the eastern fortress towards Corinth to the west and Epidaurus to the east. This transformed the fortress of Isthmia and its attendant wall section into the main overland connection to southern Greece. The wall's guarded gateways allowed for taxation of incoming and outgoing trade, which helped boost the local economy of the region. The Hexamilion wall likely had both short and long-term negative effects on the local population as well. The acquisition of land and clearing of buildings along the route of the wall led to conflict with individual property holders. In addition to its defensive role, the wall likely functioned as a means to entrench state control over local affairs. While the scale of the repairs on the Hexamilion wall during Justinian's reign suggests the fortification project would have provided employment to local laborers, which influenced the distribution of wealth within the local economy, and likely attracted many skilled laborers to the region.

=== Opposition ===
Multiple archeological finds support the idea that, during its construction, re-fortification and even after its completion, locals may have opposed the construction of the wall. One such piece of evidence was the discovery of graffiti scratched onto the rear face just west of Tower 15, This was undoubtedly made by individuals associated with the wall's initial construction or repair, as the etching occurred before the mortar had time to harden. The image depicts two galleys and a different kind of vessel seen as a boarding device suggesting naval combat and the notion of the Hexamlion’s lack of defense from seaborne threats. As Frey notes, the Hexamilion could not defend against attack from the sea, as it was designed to counter only overland threats, and did not even project into the sea on either side. This being said, we may never determine the true intentions of those who carved these images in the mortar. The may have been a simple expression of playfulness, devoid of broader meaning.

A second example which supports the idea of local opposition to the wall's construction were the graves found during the excavations between 1954 and 1976. These were located inexplicably at the base of a staircase leading to an upper fighting platform. They appear to have been placed roughly a decade after the wall's initial completion. The construction of one of the graves resulted in the removal of the bottom tread of the staircase, undermining the functionality of one of the most strategically important points of defense along the Hexamilion wall. The graves were created over a span of many decades and contained women and children, suggesting that soon after its initial construction, the Fortress' maintenance passed over to local residents.

During the later sixth and early seventh century, both the Northeast and South Gates of the Fortress were sealed with thick walls, effectively blocking the busy roadways to Athens, Corinth, and Epidaurus. This comes as a surprise to researchers given the gates' importance in connecting prominent cities. The construction style suggests they were built with haste and somewhat carelessly. The Northeast Gate was integrated with sluice gates for drainage, indicating a non-temporary residency. Exactly why the gates were sealed remains unknown. Explanations include the idea that locals may have blocked the gates themselves, as these events coincided with the timing of the Hexamilion gate repairs during the reign of Justinian. It may be the case that the local population of Isthmia resisted this alteration of their land (which would have turned it into a major thoroughfare) and acted independently to retain the status quo. Archeological findings seem to reinforce the idea of a cyclic pattern of imperial concerns followed by local indifference and opposition to Hexamilion wall and its upkeep.

Quite apart from petty graffiti protests and grave marker placements intended to “demilitarize” the wall, open revolts have also been associated with the construction and maintenance of the Hexamilion. The re-fortification of the Isthmus in an effort to counter the invasion of the Ottoman Turks in 1415 CE during Emperor Manuel II's reign led to an open revolt among the local population, which was put down by force. Manuel II saw the opposition as open resistance to the reinstatement of imperial control, whereas Chrysoloras documents a growing local frustration with the continuous funding and building of the wall.

=== Destruction of the Hexamilion ===
From its initial construction to its re-fortification and repairs throughout Justinian and Manuel II’s reign, the Hexamillion passed through many phases of use. However, the downfall of the wall can be attributed mainly to the invasions of the Ottoman Turks. In 1415, Byzantine emperor Manuel II personally supervised repairs over a period of forty days, but the rigorous demands of this effort caused unrest among local elites. The wall was breached by the Ottomans in 1423, and again in 1431 under the command of Turahan Bey. Constantine Palaiologos, who was Despot of Morea before his accession to the throne of the Byzantine Empire, and his brother Thomas restored the wall again in 1444, but the Ottomans breached it in 1446 and again in October 1452.

The final fall of the Trans-Isthmian wall occurred during a battle between Constantine and the Turks starting on November 27, 1446. Murad II, commander of a Turkish army said to have consisted of 50,000 to 60,000 men, supposedly lined the entirety of the wall with heavy artillery of long cannons (new weapons at the time), siege engines and scaling ladders. According to Chalkokondyles' vivid account of the assault, after five days of fighting Murad signaled the final attack, and on December 10, 1446, the Hexamilion was no more than a heap of ruins. After the fall of Constantinople in 1453 and the Ottoman conquest of the Peloponnese in 1460, the wall was abandoned. During its history, the wall never succeeded in fulfilling the function for which it was constructed, although it may have functioned as a deterrent. Elements of the wall are preserved south of the Corinth Canal and at the Sanctuary of Poseidon at Isthmia.

== Images of the Hexamilion ==
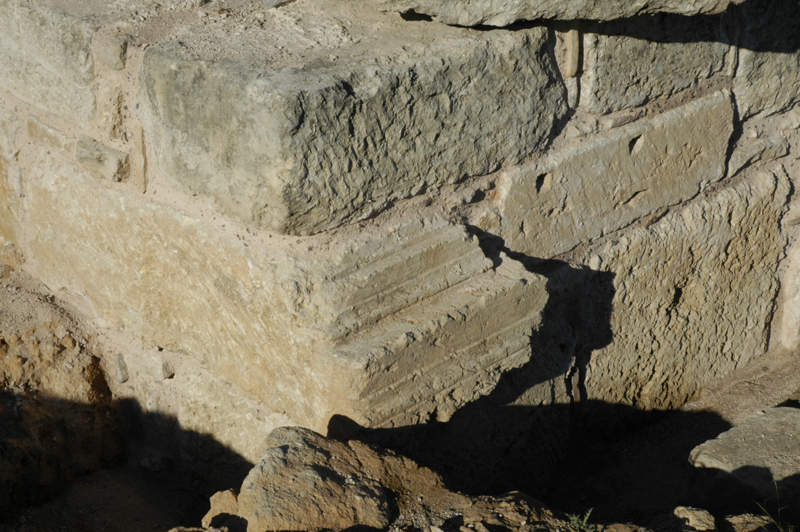
Detail of a tower foundation showing a spoliated architectural member with carved molding.

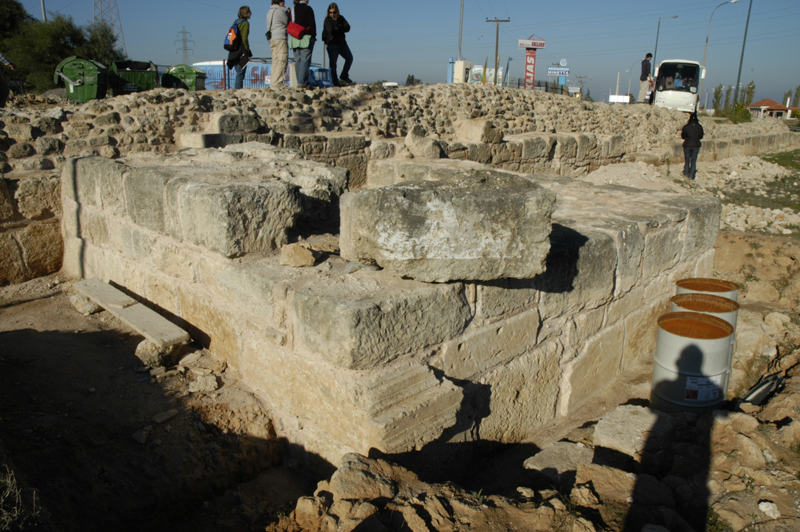
Section of the wall facing northwest.

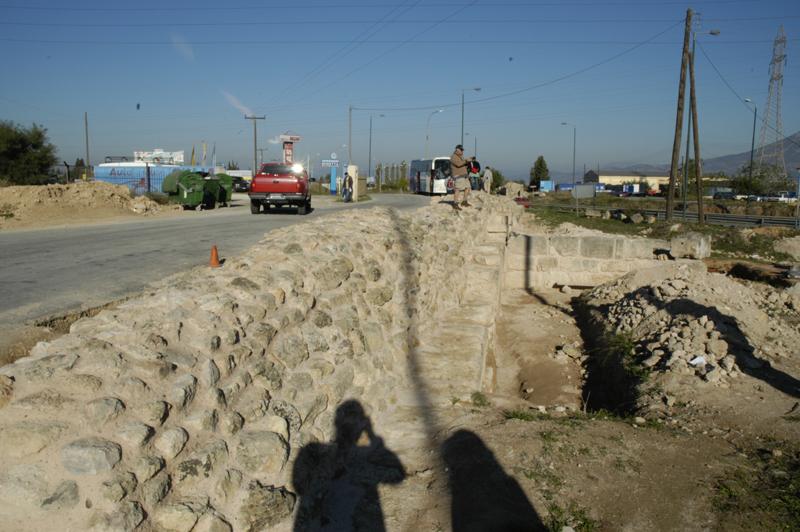
View along the line of the wall showing rubble core.

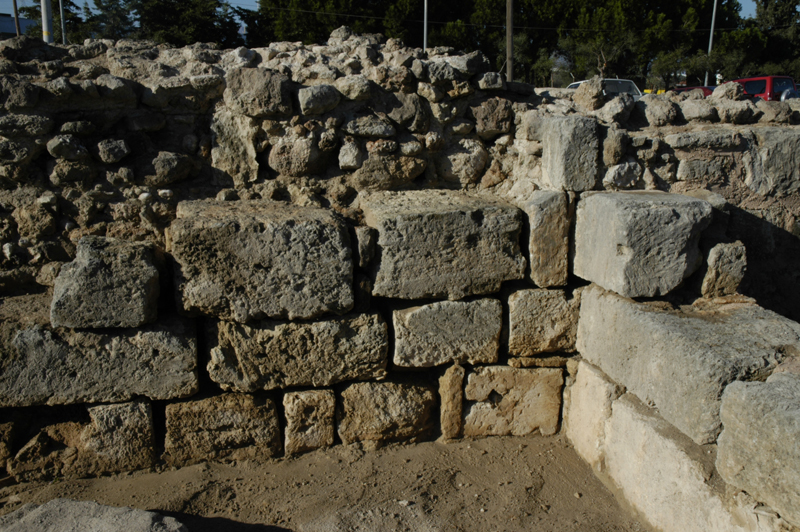
Detail of the construction showing rubble core and worked stone facing.

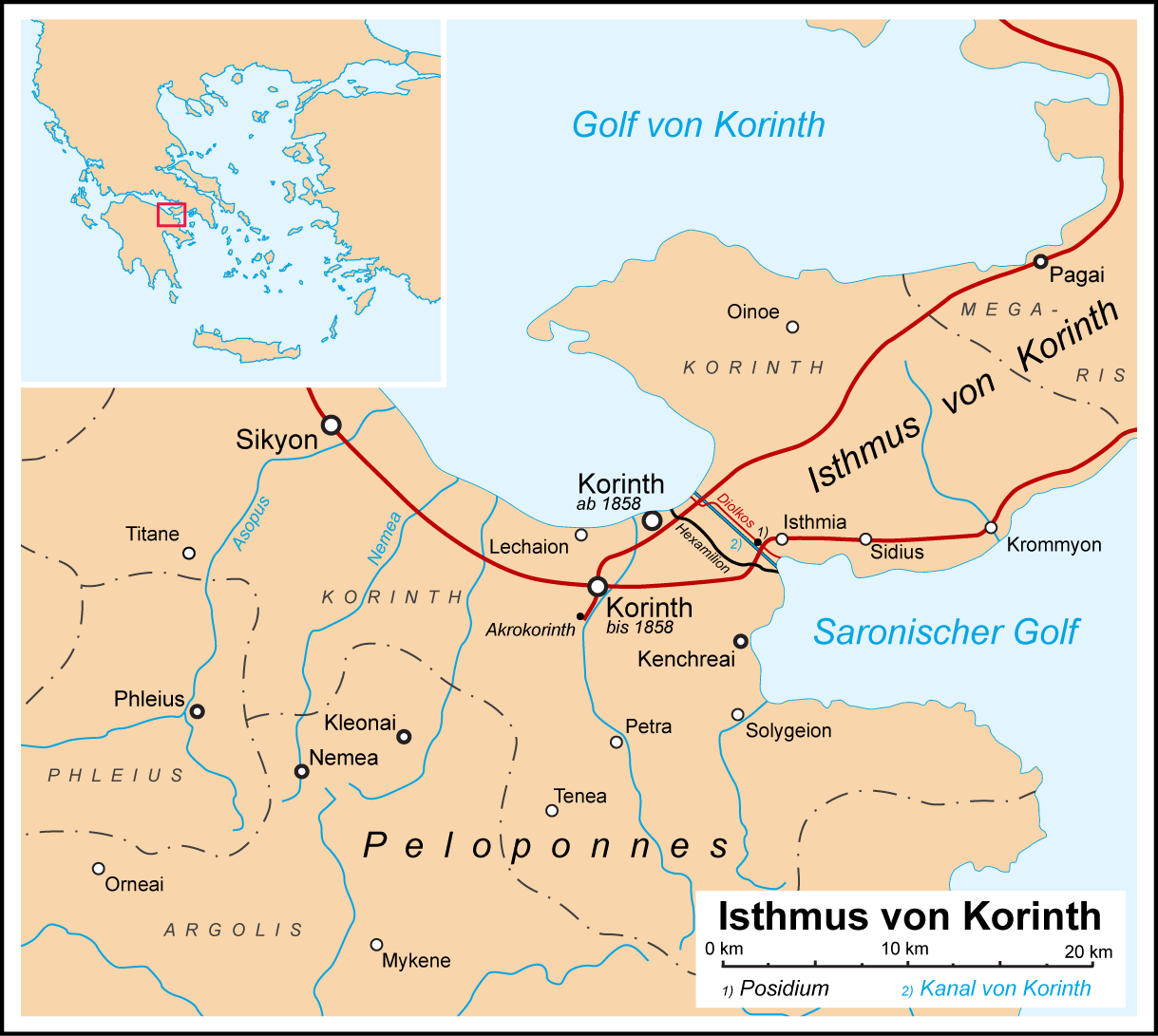
Map of the Isthmus of Corinth showing the Hexamilion location.

== See also ==
- Diolkos
