= Temple of the Delians =

Ancient Greek temple in Mykonos Municipality

Coordinates: 37.40038°N 25.26695°E

Temple of the Delians (Greece)

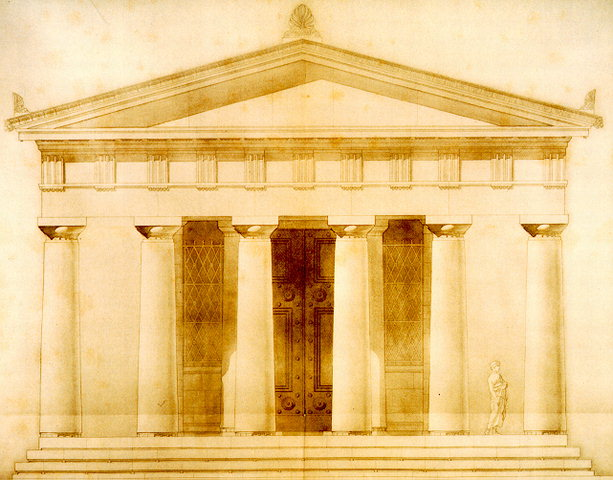
19th-century reconstruction of the Temple of Apollo

Plan of the Sanctuary of Apollo

The Temple of the Delians is the largest of the three Greek temples dedicated to Apollo within the temenos of the Sanctuary of Apollo on the Greek island of Delos. This was one of slightly more than a dozen Panhellenic sanctuaries in Ancient Greek religion and attracted visitors from across the Hellenic world. It is also known as the Great Temple or the Delian Temple of Apollo.

== History ==
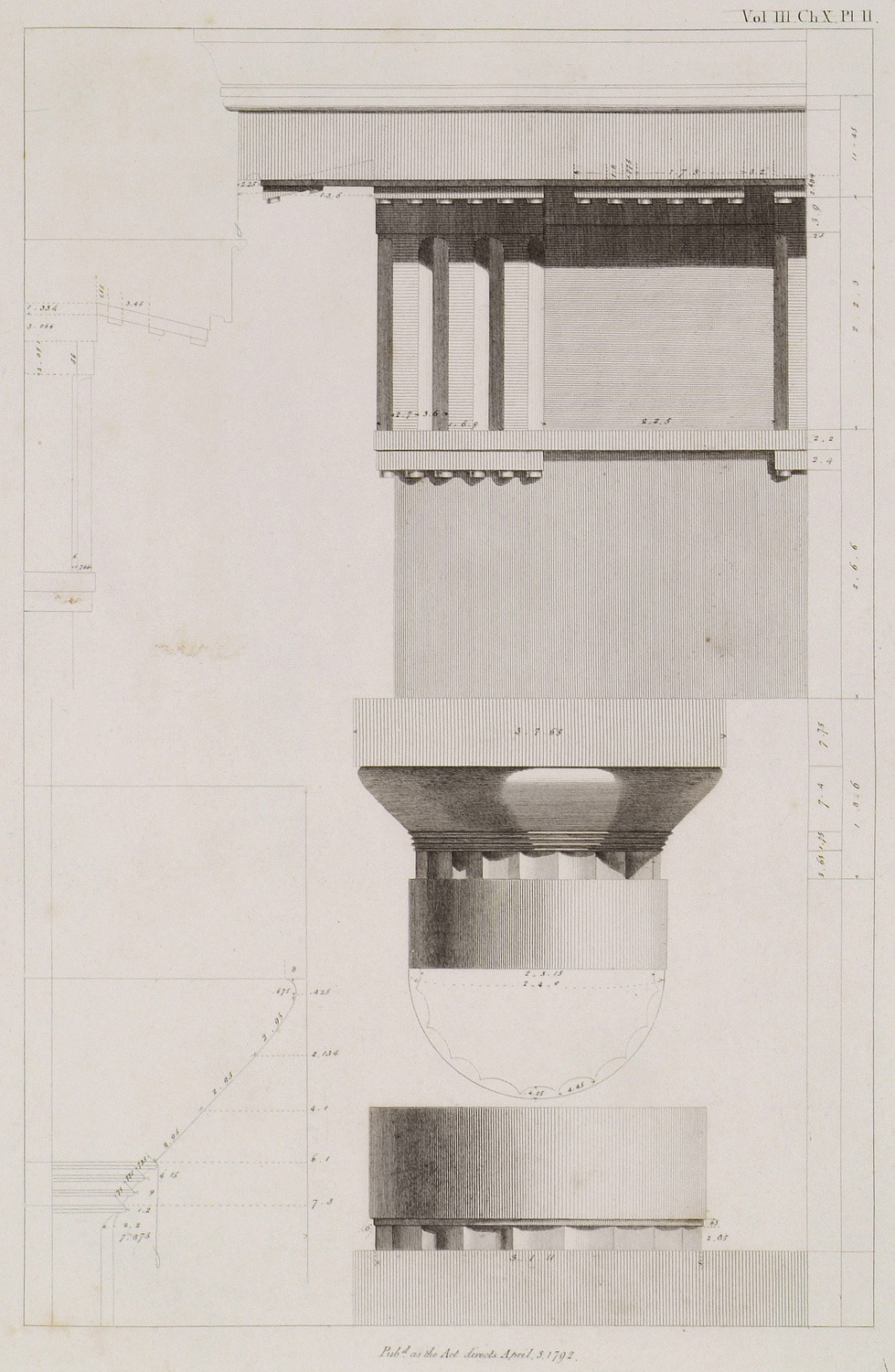
Shaft, capital, and entablature of the unfinished columns - James Athenian Stuart and Nicholas Revett, 1794

Construction was funded by the Delian League and began in 476 BC. Construction was interrupted in 454 BC when the Delian Treasury was transferred to Athens. Work resumed during Delos's period of independence after 314 BC. The finishing touches and decorative embellishments were never completed.

The temple was principally destroyed during the Mithridatic Wars and only the lower foundations, stylobate, and fragmented columns remain today.

== Description ==
The Temple of the Delians is a peripteral temple in the Doric order, with 6 columns on each short side and 13 columns along each length. The cella is aligned opening to the west with a pronaos and an opisthodomos, both distyle in antis. The temple foundations measure ca. 30 x 13 meters overall.

Because construction was suspended, remaining columns display how the ancient Greeks made their fluting. The round stone drums making up the shaft of the column were rather roughly shaped on the ground, with the fluting only done for a few inches on the top and bottom drums, as a guide for the masons. The column was then assembled in place. Normally the masons then used scaffolds to complete the fluting for the rest of the shaft, but in this temple this final stage was never done.

The temple contained the cult statue of Apollo and centuries of precious offerings. One of the treasures of the temple was a statue of Apollo made by "Angelion and Tektaos, sons of Dionysiodotos", who depicted the god with three Charites (Graces) in his hand.

The famous Colossus of the Naxians stood in the adjacent courtyard.

== Ancient descriptions ==
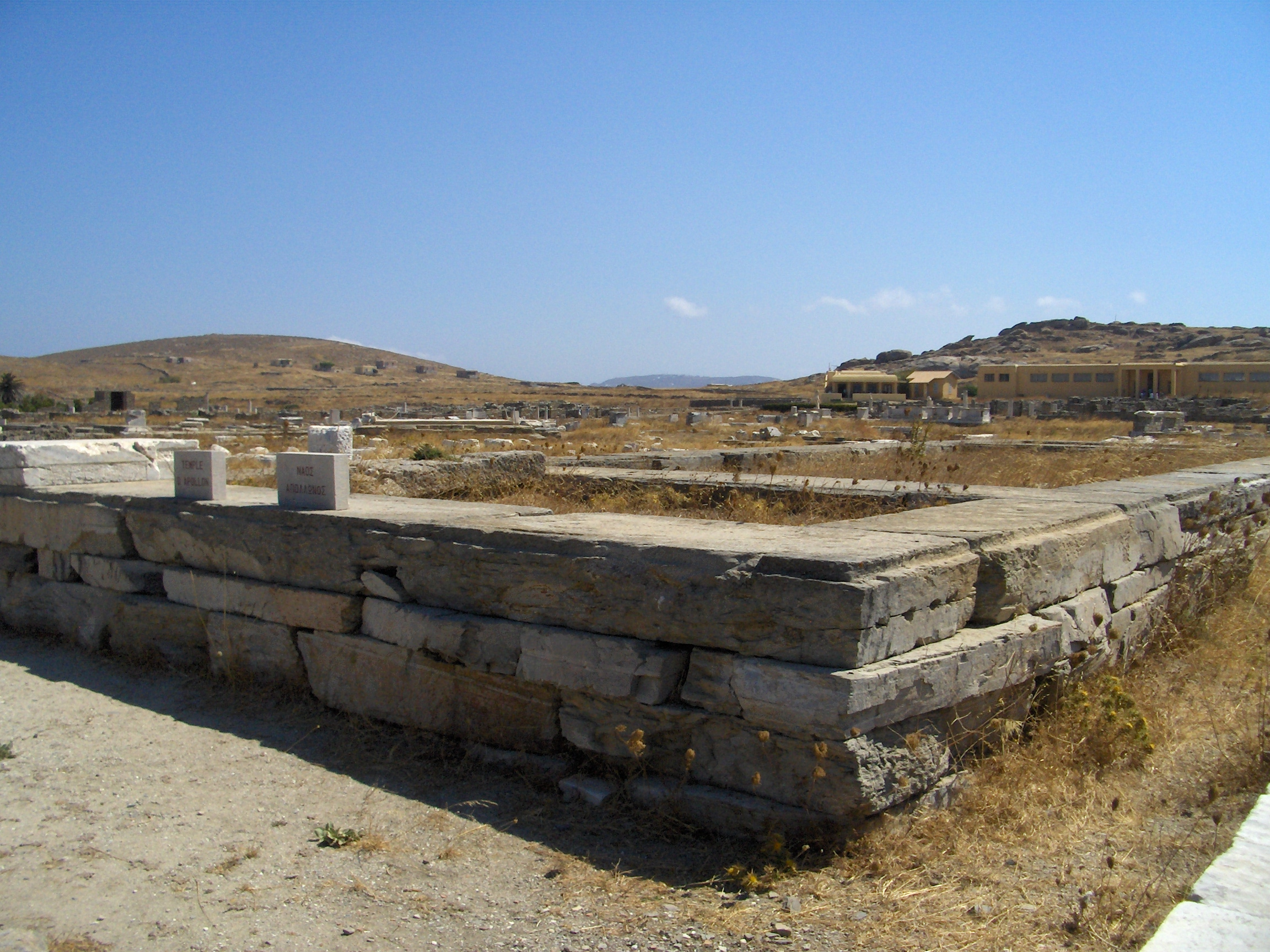
Remains of the Temple of the Delians

Strabo describes the myth behind the ancient worship of Apollo and Artemis in Delos:

Now the city which belongs to Delos, as also the temple of Apollon, and the Letoion (Temple of Leto), are situated in a plain; and above the city lies Kynthos, a bare and rugged mountain; and a river named Inopos flows through the island - not a large river, for the island itself is small. From olden times, beginning with the times of the heroes, Delos has been revered because of its gods, for the myth is told that there Leto was delivered of her travail by the birth of Apollon and Artemis : 'for aforetime,' says Pindaros, 'it was tossed by the billows, by the blasts of all manner of winds, but when [Leto] the daughter of Koios in the frenzied pangs of childbirth set foot upon it, then did four pillars, resting on adamant, rise perpendicular from the roots of the earth, and on their capitals sustain the rock. And there she gave birth to, and beheld, her blessed offspring.' The neighboring islands, called the Kyklades, made it famous, since in its honor they would send at public expense sacred envoys, sacrifices, and choruses composed of virgins, and would celebrate great general festivals there [in honour of Apollon, Artemis and Leto].

According to Strabo, Apollo and his twin Artemis were both worshipped as gods of healing and as such also identified with Helios and Selene respectively:

Both Milesians [at Didyma] and Delians invoke an Apollo Oulios, that is, as god of 'health and healing,' for the verb oulein means 'to be healthy'; whence the noun 'oule' and the salutation, 'Both health and great joy to thee'; for Apollon is the god of healing. And Artemis has her name from the fact that she makes people artemeas (Safe and Sound). And both Helios (Sun) and Selene (Moon) are closely associated with these, since they are the causes of the temperature of the air. And both pestilential diseases and sudden deaths are imputed to these gods.

Strabo described the festival of Delos as an occasion of both religious worship as well as commercial opportunities, but also the destruction of the temple:

Now although Delos had become so famous, yet the razing of Korinthos to the ground by the Romans increased its fame still more; for the importers changed their business to Delos because they were attracted both by the immunity which the temple enjoyed and by the convenient situation of the harbor; for it is happily situated for those who are sailing from Italy and Greece to Asia. The general festival [of Apollon] is a kind of commercial affair, and it was frequented by Romans more than by any other people, even when Korinthos was still in existence. And when the Athenians took the island they at the same time took good care of the importers as well as of the religious rites. But when the generals of [the Persian] Mithridates, and the tyrant who caused it to revolt, visited Delos, they completely ruined it, and when the Romans again got the island, after the king withdrew to his homeland, it was desolate; and it has remained in an impoverished condition until the present time. It is now held by the Athenians. Rheneia is a desert isle within four stadia from Delos, and there the Delians bury their dead; for it is unlawful to bury, or even burn, a corpse in Delos itself, and it is unlawful even to keep a dog there. In earlier times it was called Ortygia.

Pausanias describes the destruction and sacrilege of the temple by Mithridates:

Boiatai [in Lakedaimonia], is sacred to Apollon and called Epidelion. For the wooden image which is now here, once stood in Delos. Delos was then a Greek market, and seemed to offer security to traders on account of the god; but as the place was unfortified and the inhabitants unarmed, [the historical Persian] Menophanes, an officer of Mithridates, attacked it with a fleet, to show his contempt for the god, or acting on the orders of Mithridates; for to a man whose object is gain what is sacred is of less account than what is profitable. This Menophanes put to death the foreigners residing there and the Delians themselves, and after plundering much property belonging to the traders and all the offerings, and also carrying women and children away as slaves, he razed Delos itself to the ground. As it was being sacked and pillaged, one of the barbarians wantonly flung this image into the sea; but the wave took it and brought it to land here in the country of the Boiatai. For this reason they call the place Epidelion. But neither Menophanes nor Mithridates himself escaped the wrath of the god. Menophanes, as he was putting to sea after the sack of Delos was sunk at once by those of the merchants who had escaped; for they lay in wait for him in ships. The god caused Mithridates at a later date to lay hands upon himself, when his empire had been destroyed and he himself was being hunted on all sides by the Romans. There are some who say that he obtained a violent death as a favour at the hands of one of his mercenaries. This was the reward of their impiety.

== See also ==
- List of Ancient Greek temples
