= Bungaroosh =

Composite building material in England

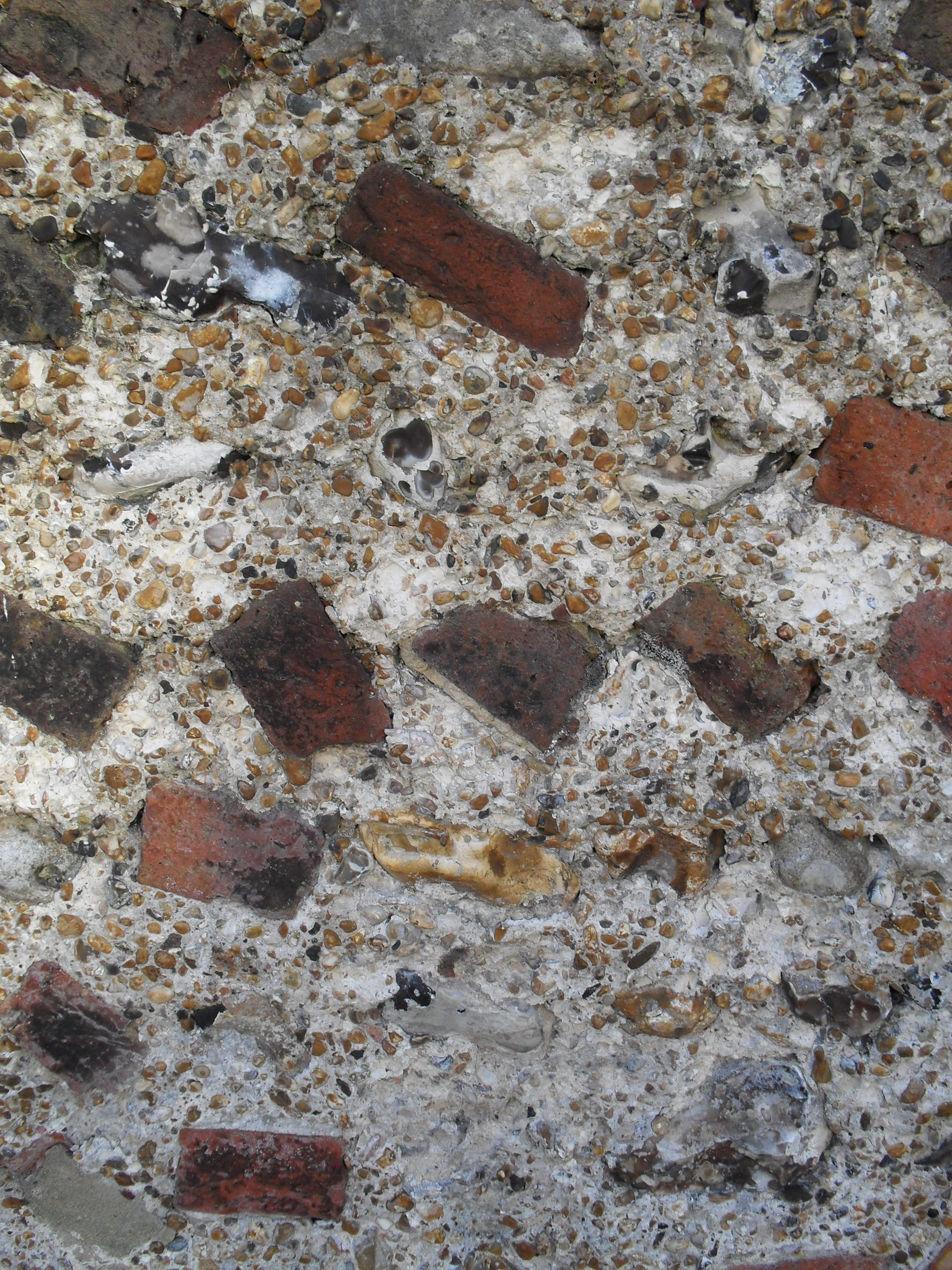
Close-up of a bungaroosh wall in the Round Hill area of Brighton

Bungaroosh (also spelt bungeroosh and other variations) is a composite building material used almost exclusively in the English seaside resort of Brighton, the neighbouring town of Hove and in the coastal Sussex area. The etymology of the word is unknown.

Bungaroosh has been described as "the worst building material in the world", since it has poor water resistance, leading to structural dampness, and crumbles easily when dry, leading to issues with structural integrity.

== History ==
Its use dates from the start of the Regency period at the end of the 18th century, and into the 19th when Brighton grew from a fishing village into a large town. Bungaroosh is often found in buildings of that era in the town and in its near neighbours Worthing and Lewes but is little known elsewhere except London. It was a building material first introduced by the Romans and has characteristics of that era. It can incorporate any of a wide variety of substances and materials and is used most often in external walls.

The manufacture of bungaroosh involved placing miscellaneous materials, such as whole or broken bricks, cobblestones, flints (commonly found on the South Downs around Brighton), small pebbles, sand and pieces of wood into hydraulic lime and then by shovelling it between shuttering until it has set. Other structural fittings, such as brick piers or wooden lintels, could then be added if more support was needed. This was particularly common in Brighton where bungaroosh walls were often built behind the stuccoed façades of Regency-style houses. Another technique was to wait for the mixture to set, then render it with a lime-based mixture and paint it. This produced a consistent, regular surface which could be used to build the symmetrical façades required in Georgian architecture, a popular style in Lewes. The material is particularly prevalent in the early 19th-century squares, crescents and terraces of Brighton's seafront, such as Regency Square, Royal Crescent and the Kemp Town estate.

== See also ==
- Buildings and architecture of Brighton and Hove
- Core-and-veneer

== Other resources ==
- "Living with … bungaroush" (PDF). Archived from the original (PDF) on 7 January 2016. (1.4 MB) (from The Regency Society)
- "Flint and bungaroush". Building crafts & skills. The Regency Town House. Archived from the original on 25 December 2013.
