= Siege of the Hexamilion Wall (1446) =

Siege of Hexamilion Wall (1446)
- Part of the Byzantine–Ottoman wars
- Hexamilion wall
| Date | 27 November – 10 December 1446 |
| Location | Hexamilion wall |
| Result | Ottoman victory |

Belligerents
| Despotate of the Morea | Ottoman Empire |

Commanders and leaders
| Constantine Palaiologos; Thomas Palaiologos | (Ottoman Empire) Murad II (Ottoman Empire) Turahan Bey |

Strength
| Unknown | 50,000 men number of cannons |

Casualties and losses
| Heavy | Unknown |

The Siege of Hexamilion Wall was a military engagement between the Ottoman army and the Byzantine forces in Morea. The Ottomans led by the Sultan Murad II, attacked and destroyed Hexamilion wall which was defended by the Byzantine Despots.

== Background ==
After the Ottoman victory at the Battle of Varna in 1444, the Crusader ships provided by the Papacy and the Duke of Burgundy made some raids on Ottoman towns in the Black Sea and the Danube. The Crusader ships returned to Constantinople in 1445. The Venetians had made their own peace treaty with the Sultan in February 1446. The Byzantines were involved in the Crusade. The Ottoman Sultan decided to take revenge on those who assisted the Crusade, particularly the Byzantines. In the winter of 1446, Murad commanded the Ottoman army himself and invaded Morea. The Ottomans overran the northern shore of the Gulf of Corinth. The Venetians did not help the Byzantines.

== Battle ==
On November 27, the Byzantine despots of Morea, Thomas Palaiologos and Constantine Palaiologos, had to face the wrath of the Sultan themselves. They both took their stand at the Hexamilion wall. The Sultan quickly ordered the wall to be destroyed. He had brought with him a large number of troops numbering 50,000 and a number of long cannons. The Byzantines had no way to counter Ottoman artillery. The Sultan wanted to test the fortification's strength, so he applied psychological pressure, hoping the despots would surrender. On December 3, the Sultan ordered the cannons to get closer to the wall. The next day, he commenced the bombardment. On December 5, skirmishes followed, testing the garrison's strength and defense. The following days were devoted to deployment of artillery and siege engines.

On December 10, the Sultan finally ordered a major assault on the wall after a brief skirmish. The Byzantines were not prepared for the assault, as the bombardment destroyed most of the wall. The Ottomans assaulted the walls. The Janissaries were in the front; a Serbian Janissary was the first to climb on it. They quickly controlled the walls and opened the gates for the rest to enter. The Ottomans began plundering the camp, massacring many of the defenders and capturing numerous prisoners. Constantine and Thomas had no choice but to escape.

== Aftermath ==
After the destruction of the Hexamilion, the Ottomans began ravaging Morea at will and left the island with a large number of captives. The despots were forced to pay tribute to the Sultan and to reduce Morea into a vassalage.

== Sources ==
- Donald M. Nicol (1993), The Last Centuries of Byzantium, 1261–1453.
- Marios Philippides (2018), Constantine XI Dragaš Palaeologus (1404–1453). The Last Emperor of Byzantium.
