= Lion of Amphipolis =

4th-century BC sculpture

Coordinates: 40°48′11″N 23°50′33″E

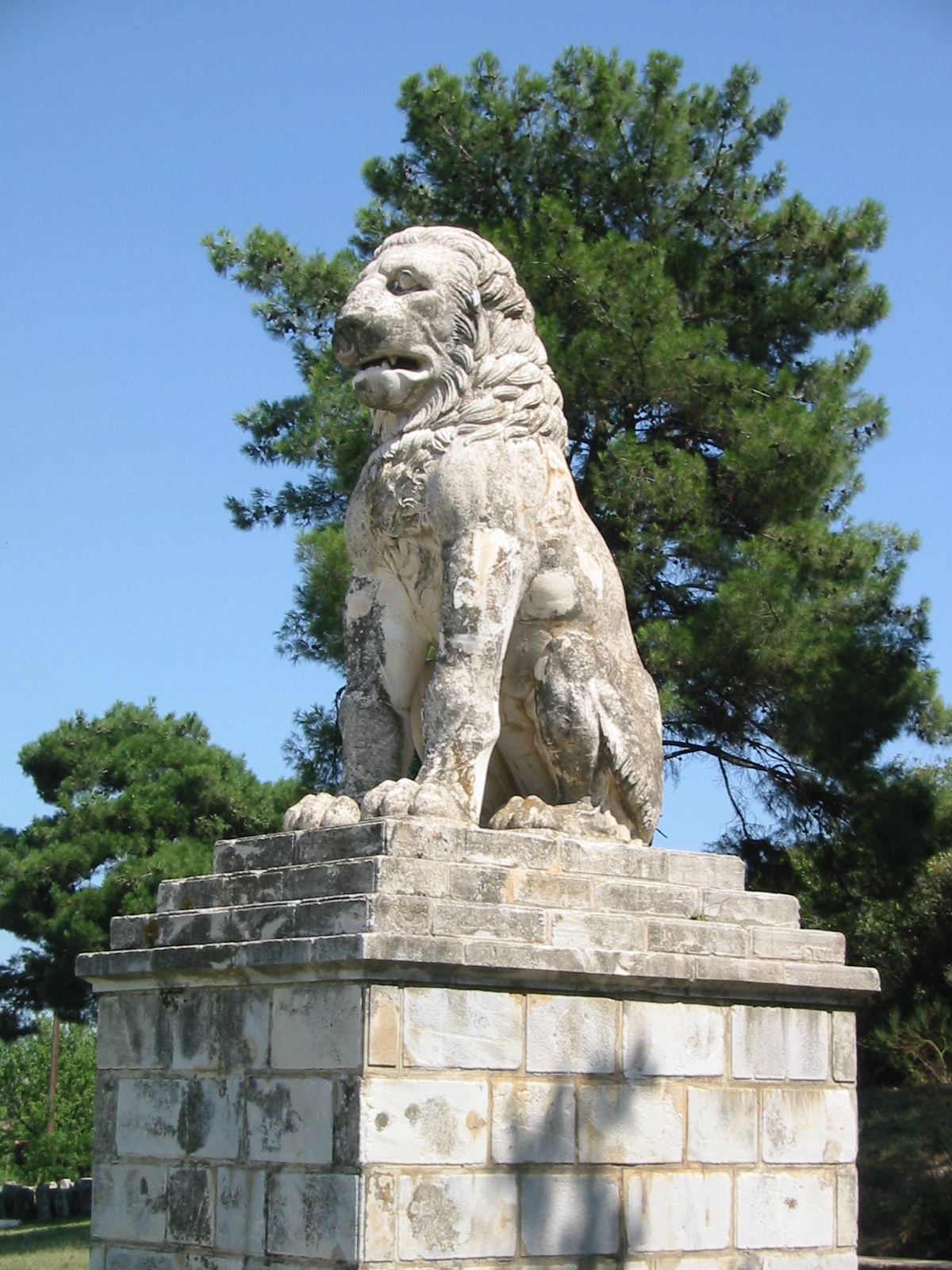
The Lion of Amphipolis

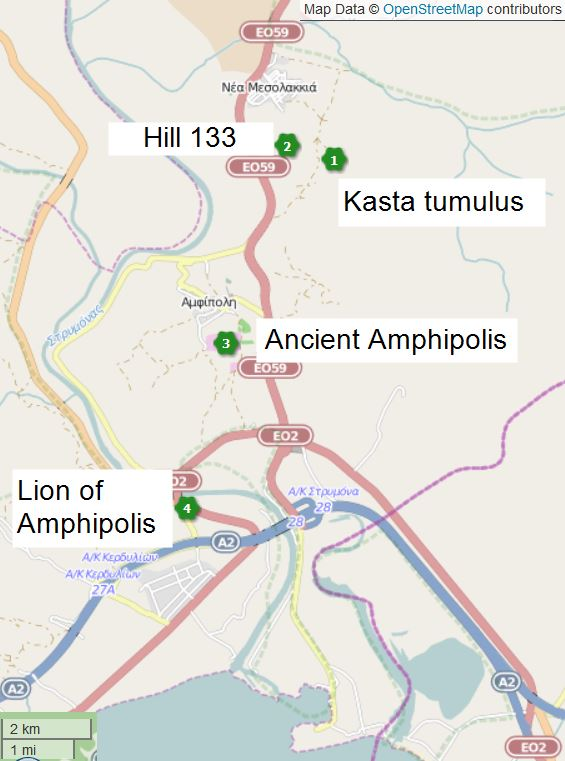
Lion of Amphipolis location

The Lion of Amphipolis (Greek: Λέων της Αμφίπολης) is a 4th-century BC tomb sculpture near Amphipolis, Macedonia, northern Greece. According to Oscar Broneer and archaeologist Dimitris Lazaridis, the first person excavating in the area in the 1960s, it was set up in honour of Laomedon of Mytilene, an important general of Alexander the Great, king of Macedon.

It is now located about 1 km outside the south gate of the ancient city.

== History ==
The discovery of the monument is connected to the modern history of Greek Macedonia, as the first parts of it were found initially by Greek soldiers during the First Balkan War in 1912–13 when they drained the Strymonas river bed (where the stone from the Lion’s plinth had been used in a dam in or after the Roman period) to build the modern bridge. They were followed by British soldiers a few years later in 1916, during World War I, who also discovered significant parts of the monument while building fortifications at the bridge. An attempt was made to remove parts of the monument but this was not enacted due to nearby combat activity

In the early 1930s, during works for draining part of Lake Kerkini nearby, there was a discovery of an ancient bridge and close to it in the river mud further, very large pieces of the marble lion. In 1937, and thanks to Lincoln MacVeagh, the US ambassador in Greece at the time, there was a private initiative along with support and funds from the Greek government to restore the Lion of Amphipolis, which eventually came to be in its current form. The whole process has been documented thoroughly by Oscar Broneer in his book The Lion of Amphipolis published in 1941.

== Description ==
Although in seated position, the lion is larger and bulkier than the one erected at Chaeronea and has a height of more than 4 m in its main body. Taking into account the base, it is taller than 8 m. The head has a width of 2 m. Its craftsmanship shows a work of the 5th or first half of 4th century BC. As to when it was erected, there is no agreement between experts as there is no mention of it in ancient sources.
