= Temple of Isthmia =

Ancient Greek temple

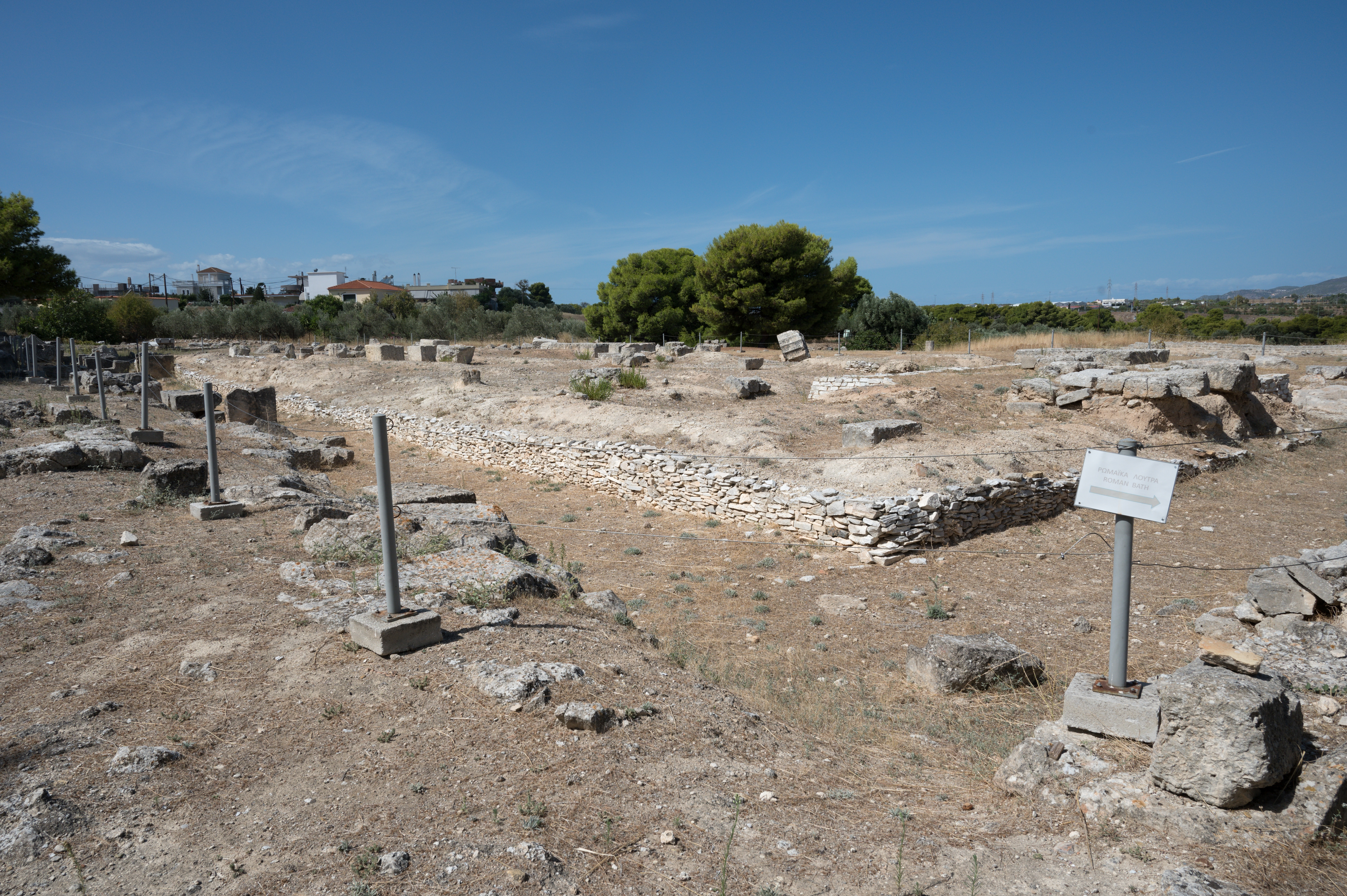
- Ruins of the Temple of Isthmia in 2020

- Location within Greece
- 37°54′57″N 22°59′35″E
- Type: Sanctuary
- Periods: Archaic Greek
- Satellite of: Isthmia
- Location: Kyras Vrysi, Corinthia, Greece
- Region: Corinthia

History
- Built: 690 to 650 BC
- Abandoned: 470 BC

Site notes
- Length: 40.05 m (131.4 ft)
- Width: 14.018 m (45.99 ft)

The Temple of Isthmia is an ancient Greek temple on the Isthmus of Corinth dedicated to the god Poseidon and built in the Archaic Period. It is about 16 kilometers (9.9 mi) east of ancient Corinth, at the site of ancient Isthmia. It appears to have been constructed in the seventh century BC though was later destroyed in 470 BC and rebuilt as the Temple of Poseidon at Isthmia in c. 440 BC during the Classical period.

== History ==
Around the turn of the 8th to 7th century BC, it is apparent that there is the emergence of a new period in both Greek architectural and artistic history. Corinth was at the centre of this with its development of new pottery design, settlement planning, military organisation and most significantly being the possible birthplace of monumental buildings and a new style of architecture known as the Doric order. The date of the Archaic temple’s construction is important then as it establishes when monumental architecture began as well as when the transition from Iron Age architecture to Doric occurred. This was also the point where the Greek temple as a whole became a defined form.

The site of the Temple of Poseidon at Isthmia was one of great activity up until the 3rd century AD. It was a Panhellenic sanctuary and the last location of one of the four Pan-Hellenic Games from the sixth century (around 581 BC) to be found, and had numerous buildings constructed in its vicinity. These ranged from Roman baths to a theatre and most importantly two temples. The Archaic temple was the first erected and was destroyed by fire in 470 BC; the site of the temple was then rebuilt upon, resulting in a larger temple constructed directly on top of the Archaic in the Classical period, which was also destroyed by fire, this time in 390 BC.

The Isthmian Games which were held near the Temple of Isthmia in honour of Poseidon was one of the four great Athletic Festivals of Ancient Greece, alongside those of Zeus at Olympia and Nemea, and those of Apollo at Delphi.

Pausanias described the sanctuary in the second century:

The Isthmos [of Korinthos] belongs to Poseidon. Worth seeing here are a theater and a white-marble race-course [where the Isthmion Games were held]. Within the sanctuary of the god [Poseidon] stand on the one side portrait statues of athletes who have won victories at the Isthmian games, on the other side pine trees growing in a row, the greater number of them rising up straight. On the temple, which is not very large, stand bronze Tritones. In the fore-temple are images, two of Poseidon, a third of Amphitrite, and of Thalassa (the Sea), which also is of bronze. The offerings inside were dedicated in our time by Herodes the Athenian, four horses, gilded except for the hoofs, which are of ivory, and two gold Tritones beside the horses, with the parts below the waist of ivory. On the car stand Amphitrite and Poseidon, and there is the boy Palaimon upright upon a dolphin. These too are made of ivory and gold. On the middle of the base on which the car has been wrought Thalassa (the Sea) holding up the young Aphrodite, and on either side are the Nymphai called Nereides . . . Among the reliefs on the base of the statue of Poseidon are the Dioskouroi sons of Tyndareus, because these too are saviours of ships and of sea-faring men. The other offerings are images of Galene (Calm) and of Thalassa (Sea), a horse like a whale from the breast onward, Ino [Leukothea] and Bellerophontes, and the horse Pegasos Within the enclosure is on the left a temple of Palaimon, with images in it of Poseidon, Leukothea and Palaimon himself. There is also what is called his Holy of Holies, and an underground descent to it, where they say that Palaimon is concealed. Whosoever, whether Korinthian or stranger, swears falsely here, can by no means escape from his oath. There is also an ancient sanctuary called the altar of the Kyklopes, and they sacrifice to the Kyklopes upon it. The graves of Sisyphos [an early king of Korinthos] and of Neleus [son of Poseidon]--for they say that Neleus came to Korinthos, died of disease, and was buried near the Isthmos.

If still in use by the 4th-century, the temple would have been closed during the persecution of pagans in the late Roman Empire. The temple of Poseidon was most likely sacked and destroyed in the invasion of the Peloponnesus by the Visigoths in AD 396.

=== Archaeology ===
Excavations of the site were conducted in both the original 1952 excavations, and again in 1989. The latter excavations helped to uncover evidence relating to all the areas of development of Isthmia from the Bronze Age to the Roman period, but in particular focused on the Archaic temple, partly because this is the most complete of the buildings found at the site despite being one of the oldest.

The site was originally found by Oscar Broneer in 1952 with excavations continuing until 1967. He published his findings in a series of three volumes starting in 1971, and in articles in the Hesperia Journal. He dated the temple to about 700 BC and produced a reconstruction of the temple which featured a wooden peristyle in the Doric style.

Between August 16 and November 29, 1989 a new period of excavation was undertaken, mostly to clear up some of the disputes that had arisen over the conclusions Broneer had made on his finds. The first report of the 1989 findings was published in Hesperia in 1992, with subsequent reports following in later years and has contributed to the debate which primarily focuses around the dating of the temple, but also includes the nature of its layout and general usage and development.

== Dating ==
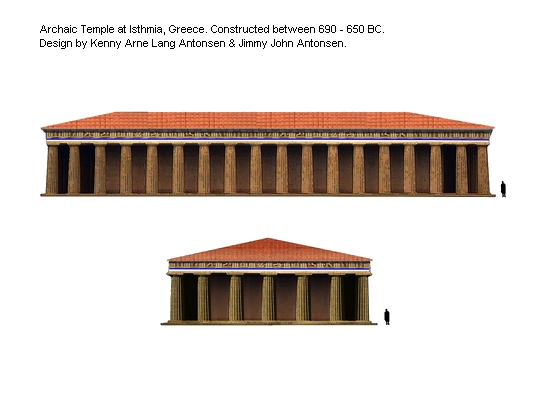
Reconstruction of the Archaic Temple of Isthmia, Greece. Constructed between 690–650 BC.

The debates that occurred after the first publication of Broneer's results focused on his inclusion of a wooden peristyle of the Doric order, and a construction date of c. 700 BC. Historians such as J. B. Salmons in his book Wealthy Corinth (1984) stated that the temple was constructed under the reign of Cypselus; this contradicted Broneer's suggestions as Cypselus did not achieve power until 657 BC, and so would put back the creation of the temple by about 50 years. Furthermore, it was disputed whether the temple was even Doric in design and the proposed plan of Broneer detailing the temples foundations had little evidence in support.

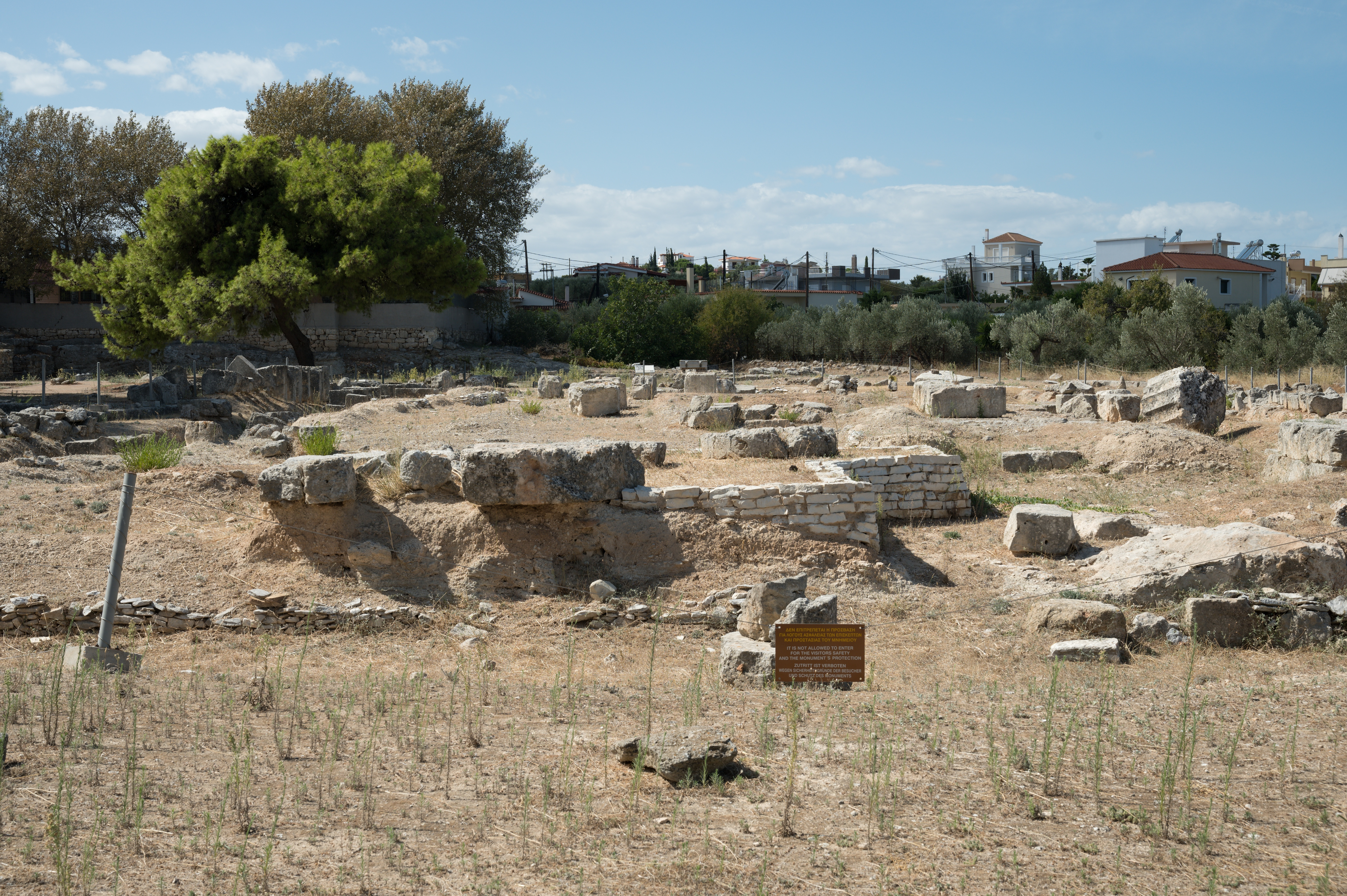
Ruins of the temple of Isthmia.

The 1989 excavations contained important discoveries that helped to establish that the temple was actually constructed later than Broneer had anticipated, and puts it at a date that ranges from about 690 to 650 BC. This date would mean that it could have been possible for it to have been constructed during Cypselus’ reign, as well as suggesting a later date for appearance of monumental buildings. The excavations achieved their results through a variety of methods. Prior to the excavations topographical and stratigraphical investigations were carried out of the known buildings under the surface. When digging commenced trenches were made, for the most part extensions on Broneer’s original trenches. The soil that was collected was then both dry sieved and wet sieved and from this many finds were made. Deposits containing large amounts of pottery, ashes as well as stone foundations were all found which helped to determine answers to many of the questions that had been raised. The Ceramics recovered helped to ascertain a more accurate date, this was through the finding of pottery such as that of the aryballoi style, which is an effective means of dating owing to their introduction at the beginning of the seventh century. Furthermore, the ground plan and surrounding features of the site were now able to be mapped with a good degree of accuracy. In the reports, this fact that the temple floor plan could be reconstructed accurately is mentioned as the most important find of the 1989 excavations. The ground plan showed a temple that was of unrivalled proportions for its time and of a layout that was almost entirely new. This therefore showed the origins of monumental buildings on the Greek mainland and provided an approximate date. Also though it further established that there was no evidence for the employment of the Doric style as suggested by Broneer. Although Broneer stated of his reconstruction that it was speculative, and still appears to have no evidence in support its existence, this does not mean the temple was not one of the pioneering buildings featuring Doric architecture. This is because all that is known from the temple is what has been found in deposits of pottery and the stone foundations, as the temple was completely destroyed in 470 BC (also known from pottery discovered during excavations, particularly burnt pottery). There is little that remains other than the floor plan, or at least that has been found thus far, and so the actual style is hard to put any firm conclusion to. It is however apparent from the excavations though, the layout of supporting pillars and dimensions, which beyond doubt can tell us that it was a temple of epic proportions for its time.

== See also ==
- List of Ancient Greek temples
- Architecture of Ancient Greece
- List of Greco-Roman roofs
