= Panhellenic sanctuary =

Holy sanctuary in Ancient Greece

Some of the known panhellenic sanctuaries listed among the main Greek sanctuaries.

A Panhellenic sanctuary was a sanctuary, shrine or place of worship in Ancient Greece, that was open to all Greeks regardless of the city-state it belonged to. These places were often the subject of pilgrimages from all the Greek world.

Normally, a sanctuary or shrine belonged to the city in which territory it was situated. Panhellenic sanctuaries were places of neutrality, and were therefore used as neutral places of political meetings between different Greek city-states, places where Panhellenic Games were held, and well as places where different Greek powers could keep their treasuries.

Known Panhellenic sanctuaries were:

- Claros: Temple of Apollo, Claros, dedicated to Apollo.
- Delos: Temple of the Delians, dedicated to Apollo.
- Delphi: Sanctuary of Apollo, site of the Oracle of Delphi, dedicated to Apollo.
- Didyma: Temple of Apollo, Didyma, dedicated to Apollo.
- Dodona: Temple of Zeus, Dodona, dedicated to Zeus.
- Eleusis: Telesterion, the site of the Eleusinian Mysteries, dedicated to Demeter and Persephone.
- Epidaurus: Temple of Asclepius, Epidaurus, dedicated to Asclepius.
- Isthmus of Corinth: Temple of Isthmia, dedicated to Poseidon.
- Olympia, Greece: cult center of Zeus.
- Oropos: Amphiareion of Oropos, dedicated to the hero Amphiaraos.
- Magnesia on the Maeander: Temple of Artemis Leucophryene, dedicated to Artemis.
- Nemea: Temple of Zeus, Nemea, dedicated to Zeus.
- Samothrace: Samothrace temple complex, dedicated to several deities; the Great Mother, Hecate, Hermes, the Dioscuri, and Hades and Persephone.

== History ==
In the 8th century BC, these sites became popular and were often old sacred sites and buildings given new roles to match the politics of the age.
