= Core-and-veneer =

Wall building technique

Core-and-veneer, brick and rubble, wall and rubble, ashlar and rubble, and emplekton all refer to a building technique where two parallel walls are constructed and the core between them is filled with rubble or other infill, creating one thick wall. Originally, and in later poorly constructed walls, the rubble was not consolidated. Later, mortar and cement were used to consolidate the core rubble and produce sturdier construction.

Modern masonry still uses core and veneer walls; however, the core is now generally concrete block instead of rubble, and moisture barriers are included. Often such walls end up as cavity walls by the inclusion of space between the external veneer and the core in order to provide for moisture and thermal control.

== History ==
=== Greeks and Phoenicians ===
Both the early Phoenicians and Greeks used rubble-filled masonry walls. The word emplekton was borrowed from Greek ἔμπλεκτον and originally meant "rubble" but came to apply to the construction technique as well.

=== Romans ===
The Romans started with basic emplekton masonry walls, but developed the technique further using temporary walls (forms) that were removed after the cemented rubble (concrete) had cured. This technique was called opus caementicium, and eventually led to modern ferroconcrete construction.

=== India ===
The buildings of the Taj Mahal are constructed with walls of brick and rubble inner cores faced with either marble or sandstone locked together with iron dowels and clamps. Some of the walls of the mausoleum are several metres thick. Koch, Ebba (2006). The Complete Taj Mahal: And the Riverfront Gardens of Agra. London: Thames & Hudson. p. 97. ISBN 978-0-500-34209-1.

=== Ancestral Puebloans ===
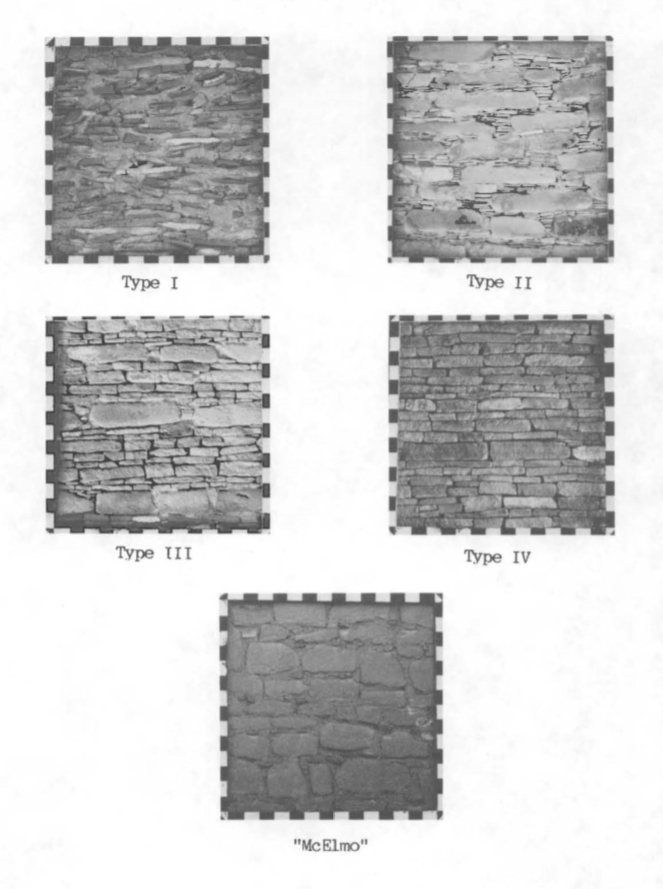
Chacoan Masonry types by Stephen H. Lekson

In the large complexes at Chaco Canyon, the Ancestral Puebloans used the wall and rubble technique, with walls of carefully shaped sandstone. The Ancestral Puebloans used mud as their mortar, both with the veneer and to consolidate the core. This core and veneer technique was also used at other Ancestral Puebloans sites outside of Chaco Canyon. Later pueblos used mud bricks (adobe) for the veneer.

=== Mayan ===
In the Puuc region, and as far south as at least Tikal, the Mayans developed core-and-veneer walls to the point where, by the classic period, they were filled with concrete.

== Problems ==
Traditional core-and-veneer walls suffered from moisture migration and thermal expansion and contraction. They had a low tensile strength, hence a poor resistance to twisting or stretching. Tensile strength was increased by increasing the width of the walls or by providing masonry "piers" (vertical columns or ribs), either inside the wall or as additional exterior support.

== See also ==
- Bungaroosh
- Cavity wall
