= Magna Graecia =

Historical region of Italy

Magna Graecia Μεγάλη Ἑλλάς (Ancient Greek)
- Historical region
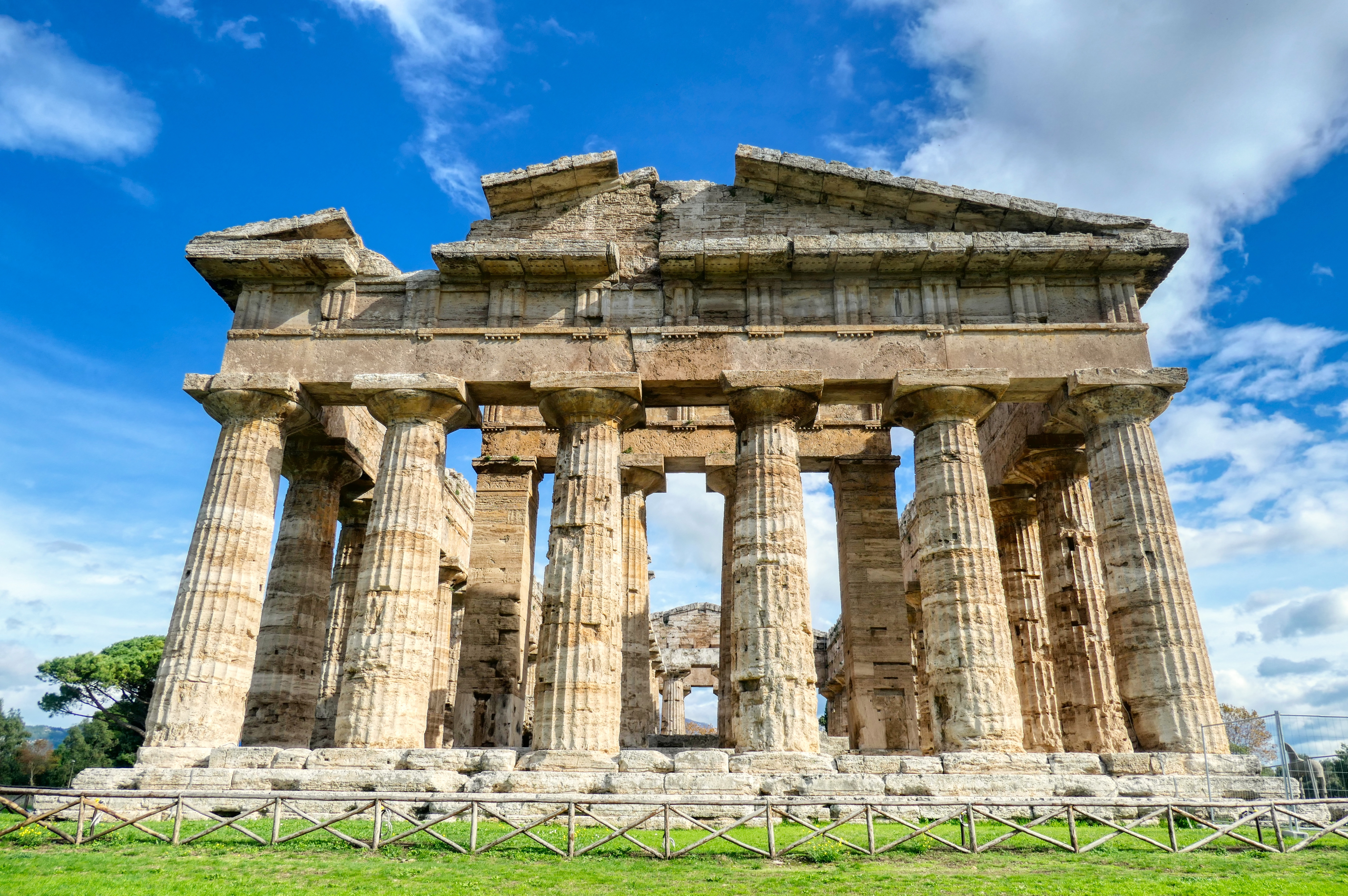
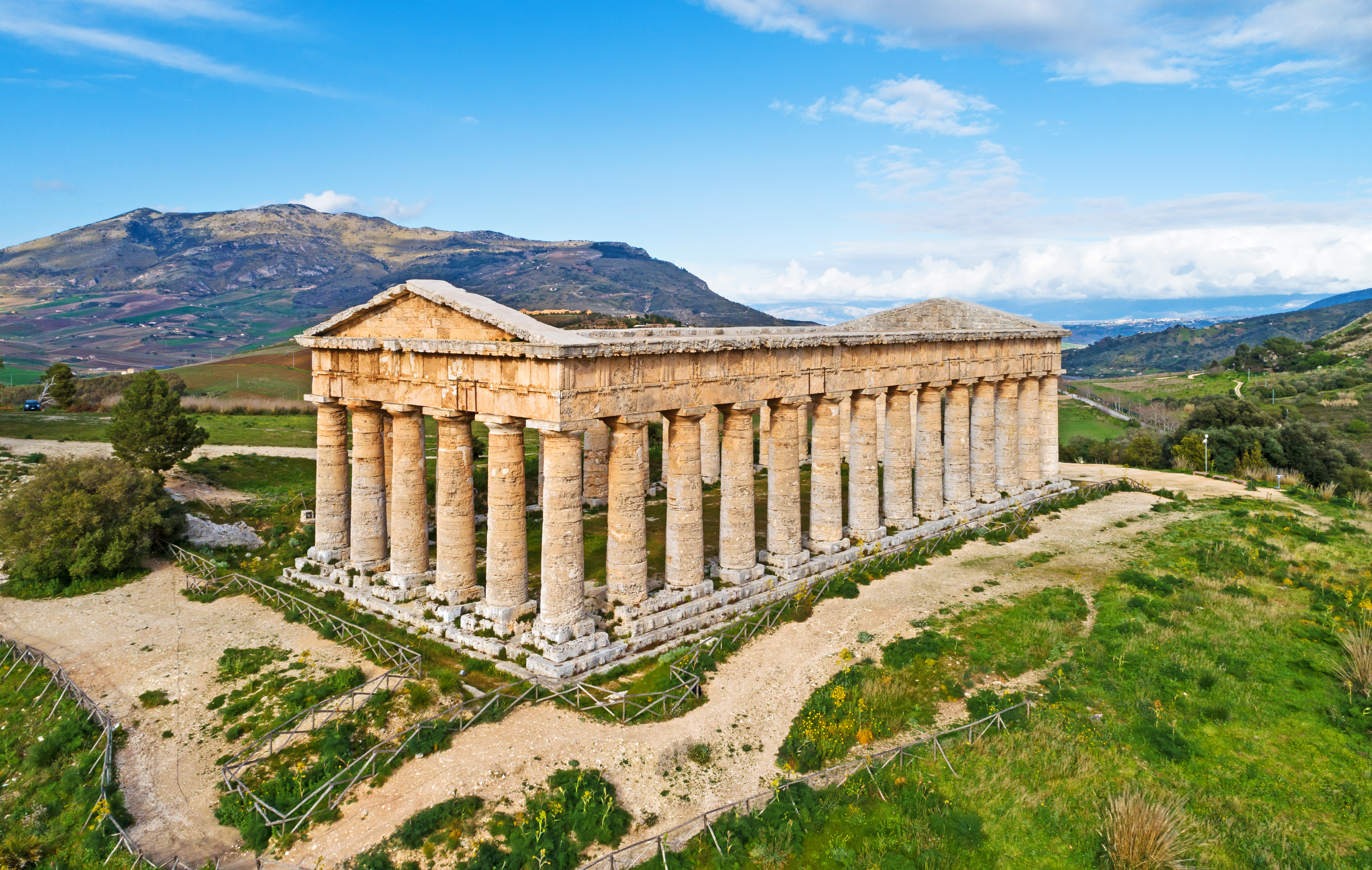
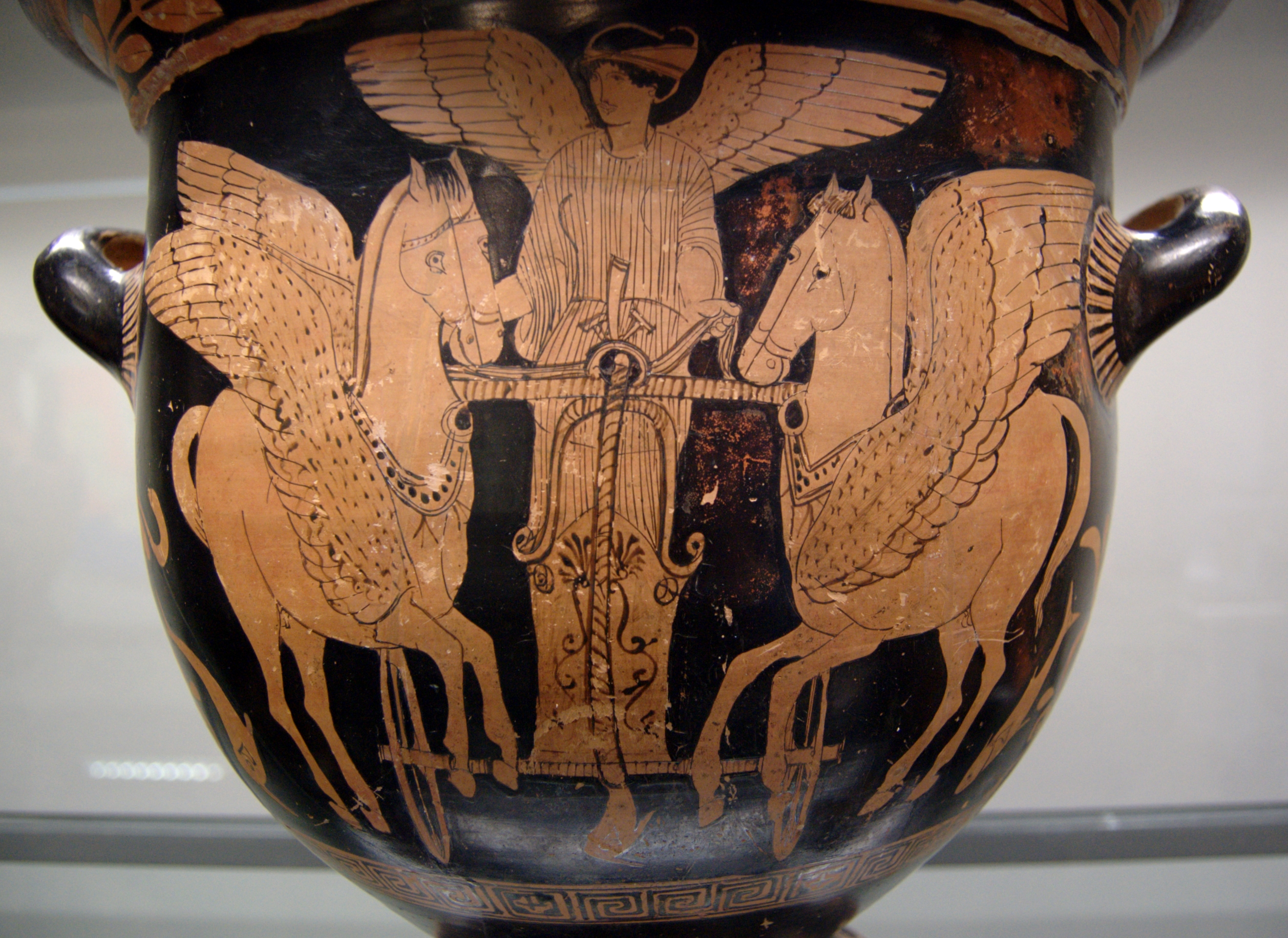
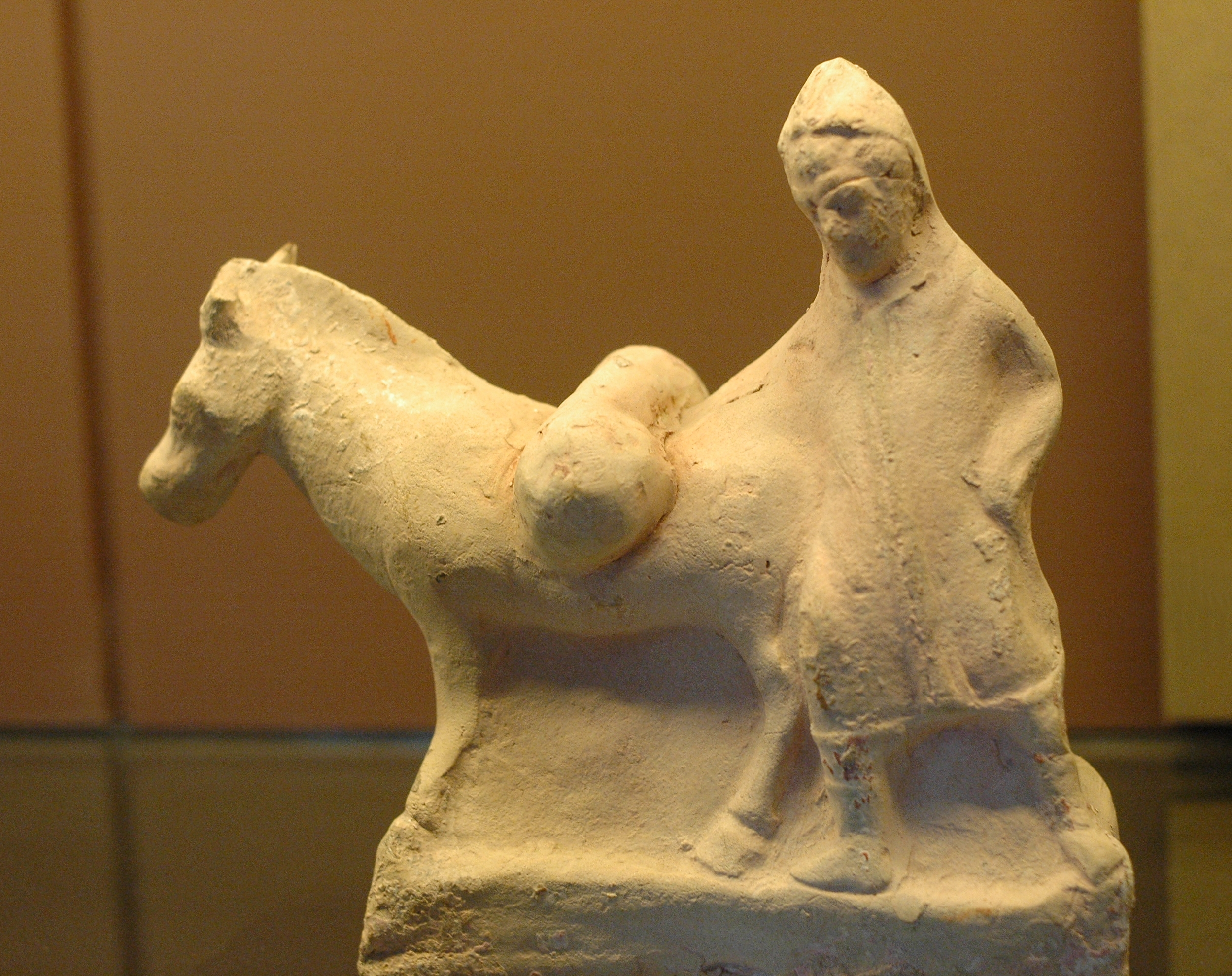
- Clockwise from top left: Second Temple of Hera in Poseidonia, Campania; Doric-styled temple, Segesta, Sicily; Taras' sculpture of a young man wearing cucullus and leading his donkey, Louvre; depiction of Eos riding a two-horsed chariot, on a krater from Southern Italy, Staatliche Antikensammlungen.
- Etymology: from Ancient Greek and Latin ("Great[er] Greece")
- Ancient Greek colonies and their dialect groupings in Magna Graecia.
- Present country: Italy
- Present territory: Southern Italy
- Founded: 8th century BC
- Founder: Greeks
- Largest city: Sybaris

Government
  - Type: city-states administered by the aristocracy
- Demonym(s): Italiote and Siceliote

Magna Graecia (Note: UK: /ˌmæɡnə ˈɡriːsiə, - ˈɡriːʃə/ MAG-nə GREE-see-ə, - GREE-shə, US: /- ˈɡreɪʃə/ - GRAY-shə, Latin: [ˈmaŋna ˈɡrae̯ki.a]; lit. 'Great[er] Greece'; Ancient Greek: Μεγάλη Ἑλλάς, romanized: Megálē Hellás, IPA: [meɡálɛː hellás], with the same meaning; Italian: Magna Grecia, IPA: [ˈmaɲɲa ˈɡrɛːtʃa].) was the historical Greek-speaking area of southern Italy. It encompassed the modern Italian regions of Calabria, Apulia, Basilicata, Campania, and Sicily. These regions were extensively settled by Greeks beginning in the 8th century BC.

Initially founded by their metropoleis (mother cities), the settlements evolved into independent and powerful Greek city-states (poleis). The settlers brought with them Hellenic civilization, which over time developed distinct local forms due to both their distance from Greece and the influence of the indigenous peoples of southern Italy. This interaction left a lasting imprint on Italy, including on Roman culture. The Greek settlers also influenced native groups such as the Sicels and the Oenotrians, many of whom adopted Greek culture and became Hellenized. In areas like architecture and urban planning, the colonies sometimes surpassed the achievements of the motherland. The ancient inhabitants of Magna Graecia are referred to as Italiotes and Siceliotes.

Ruins of several cities from Magna Graecia remain visible today, including Neàpolis ("New City", now Naples), Syrakousai (Syracuse), Akragas (Agrigento), Taras (Taranto), Rhegion (Reggio Calabria), and Kroton (Crotone). The most populous city was Sybaris (now Sibari), with an estimated population of between 300,000 and 500,000, from 600 to 510 BC.

Governments in these city-states were typically aristocratic, and the cities often engaged in warfare with one another. Their independence came to an end during the Second Punic War, when they were annexed by the Roman Republic in 205 BC.

Despite the political changes, cultural life in Magna Graecia flourished. Greek art, literature, and philosophy had a decisive influence on the region, especially in cities like Taras. South Italian Greek pottery, particularly from the 4th century BC, is a notable cultural contribution. Settlers from Magna Graecia also achieved great success in the Ancient Olympic Games—athletes from Crotone alone won 18 titles over 25 Olympiads.

Though ancient authors use "Magna Graecia" to mean different parts of southern Italy, including or excluding Sicily, definitions that included Sicily failed to gain widespread acceptance, as evidenced by the continued usage of the term referring exclusively to the Greek cities of southern Italy spanning the coast between Cumae and Taras.

Although most Greek inhabitants of Magna Graecia were fully Latinized during the Middle Ages, traces of Greek language and culture persisted. The Griko people of Calabria (Bovesia) and Salento (Grecìa Salentina) still maintain aspects of their Greek heritage, including the Griko language. This language is the last living trace of the once-vibrant Greek presence in Magna Graecia.

== Terminology ==
Ethnolinguistic map of Italy in the Iron Age, before the Roman expansion and conquest of Italy

The original Greek expression Megálē Hellás (lit. 'Great[er] Greece'), later translated into Latin as Magna Graecia, is attested for the first time in a passage from the 2nd century BC by the Greek historian Polybius (written around 150 BC), where he ascribed the term to Pythagoras and his philosophical school.

Ancient authors used "Magna Graecia" to mean different parts of southern Italy, including or excluding Sicily; Strabo and Livy being the most prominent advocates of the wider definitions. Originally, the geographical area referred to as Magna Graecia most likely centered around the coast extending from Lokroi to Metapontum. Later authors expanded this definition to include all areas united under the Italiote League, then dominated by Taras. Some Roman authors, most prominently Strabo and Livy, advocated for wider definitions, which included Sicily. Strabo used the term to refer to the territory that had been conquered by the Greeks. Definitions that included Sicily failed to gain widespread acceptance, as evidenced by the continued usage of the term referring exclusively to the Greek cities of southern Italy spanning the coast between Cumae and Taras.

There are various hypotheses on the origin of the name Megálē Hellás. The term could be explained by the prosperity and cultural and economic splendour of the region (6th–5th century BC); notably by the Achaeans of the city of Kroton, to refer to the network of colonies they founded or controlled between the end of the 6th and mid-5th centuries at the time of the Pythagoreans.

== Context ==
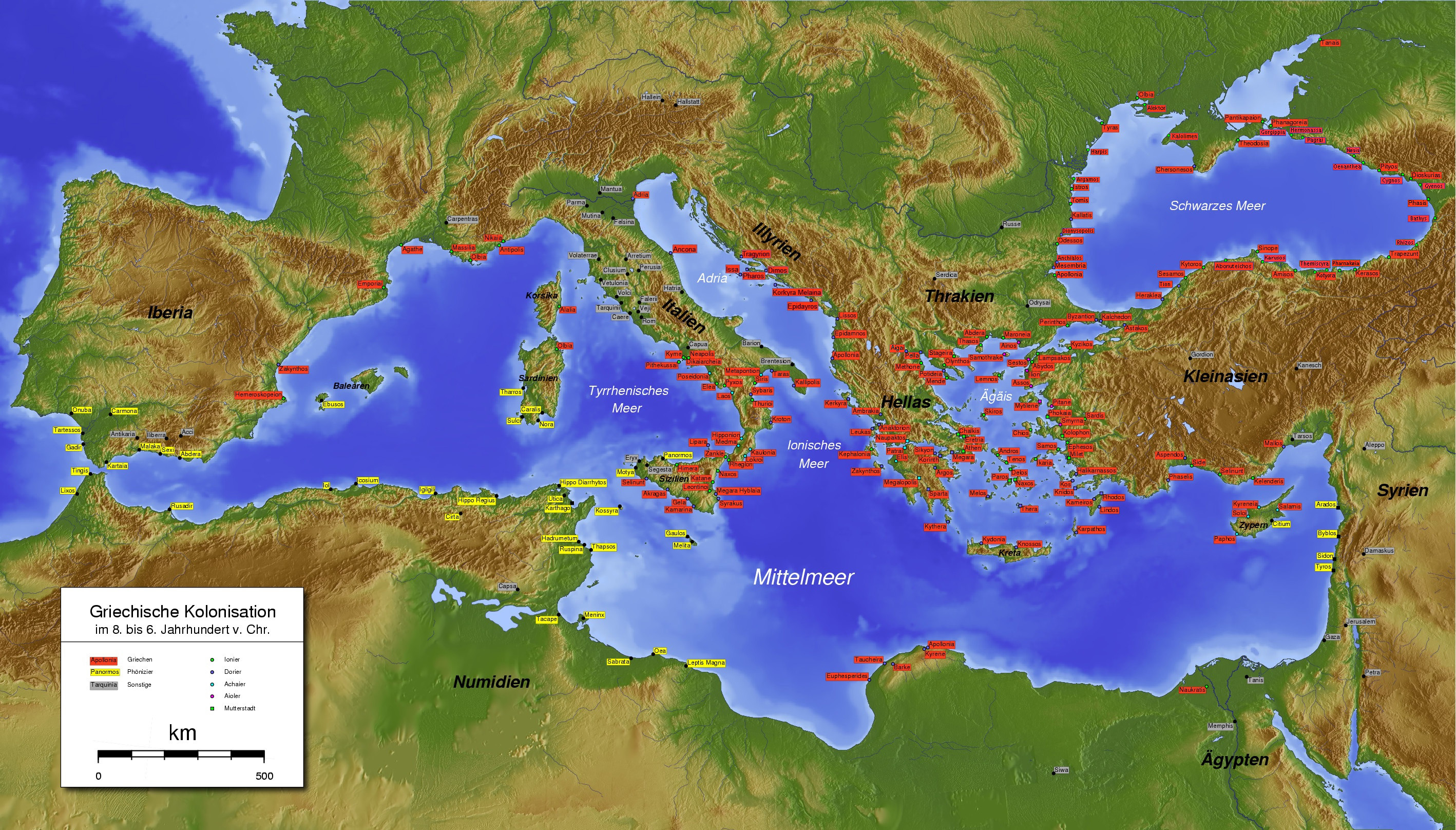
Greek colonies and their metropolitan cities depicted with red labels, while Phoenician colonies are depicted with yellow labels (4th century BC)

There were several reasons for the Greeks to establish overseas colonies; demographic crises (famine, overcrowding, etc.), stasis, a developing need for new commercial outlets and ports, and expulsion from their homeland after wars.

During the Archaic period, the Greek population grew beyond the capacity of the limited arable land of Greece proper, resulting in the large-scale establishment of colonies elsewhere: according to one estimate, the population of the widening area of Greek settlement increased roughly tenfold from 800 BC to 400 BC, from 800,000 to as many as 7 1/2-10 million. This was not simply for trade, but also to found settlements. These Greek colonies were not, as Roman colonies were, dependent on their mother-city, but were independent city-states in their own right.

Another reason was the strong economic growth with the consequent overpopulation of the motherland. The terrain that some of these Greek city-states were in could not support a large city. Politics was also the reason as refugees from Greek city-states tended to settle away from these cities in the colonies.

Greeks settled outside of Greece in two distinct ways. The first was in permanent settlements founded by the Greeks, which formed as independent poleis. The second form was in what historians refer to as emporia; trading posts which were occupied by both Greeks and non-Greeks and which were primarily concerned with the manufacture and sale of goods. Examples of this latter type of settlement are found at Al Mina in the east and Pithekoussai in the west.

From about 750 BC the Greeks began 250 years of expansion, settling colonies in all directions.

== History ==
=== Greek colonisation ===
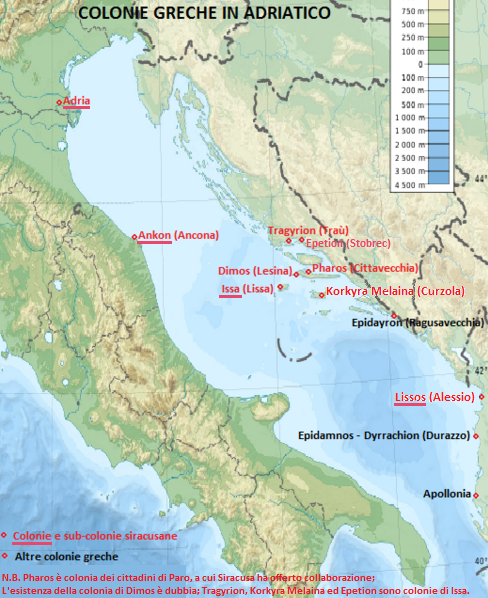
Syracusan (red) and other Greek colonies (black) in the Adriatic

According to Strabo's Geographica, the colonisation of Magna Graecia had already begun by the time of the Trojan War and lasted for several centuries.

Greeks began to settle in southern Italy in the 8th century BC. Their first great migratory wave was by the Euboeans aimed at the Gulf of Naples (Pithecusae, Cumae) and the Strait of Messina (Zancle, Rhegium). Pithecusae on the island of Ischia is considered the oldest Greek settlement in Italy, and Cumae their first colony on the mainland of Italy.

The second wave was of the Achaeans who concentrated initially on the Ionian coast (Metapontion, Poseidonia, Sybaris, Kroton), shortly before 720 BC. At an unknown date between the 8th and 6th centuries BC the Athenians, of Ionian lineage, founded Scylletium (near today's Catanzaro).

With colonisation, Greek culture was exported to Italy with its dialects of the Ancient Greek language, its religious rites, and its traditions of the independent polis. An original Hellenic civilization soon developed, and later interacted with the native Italic civilisations. The most important cultural transplant was the Chalcidean/Cumaean variety of the Greek alphabet, which was adopted by the Etruscans; the Old Italic alphabet subsequently evolved into the Latin alphabet, which became the most widely used alphabet in the world.

Remains of some of these Greek colonies can be seen today, such as those of Neapolis ('new city', now Naples), Syracusae (Syracuse), Akragas (Agrigento), Taras (Taranto), and Rhegion (Reggio Calabria).

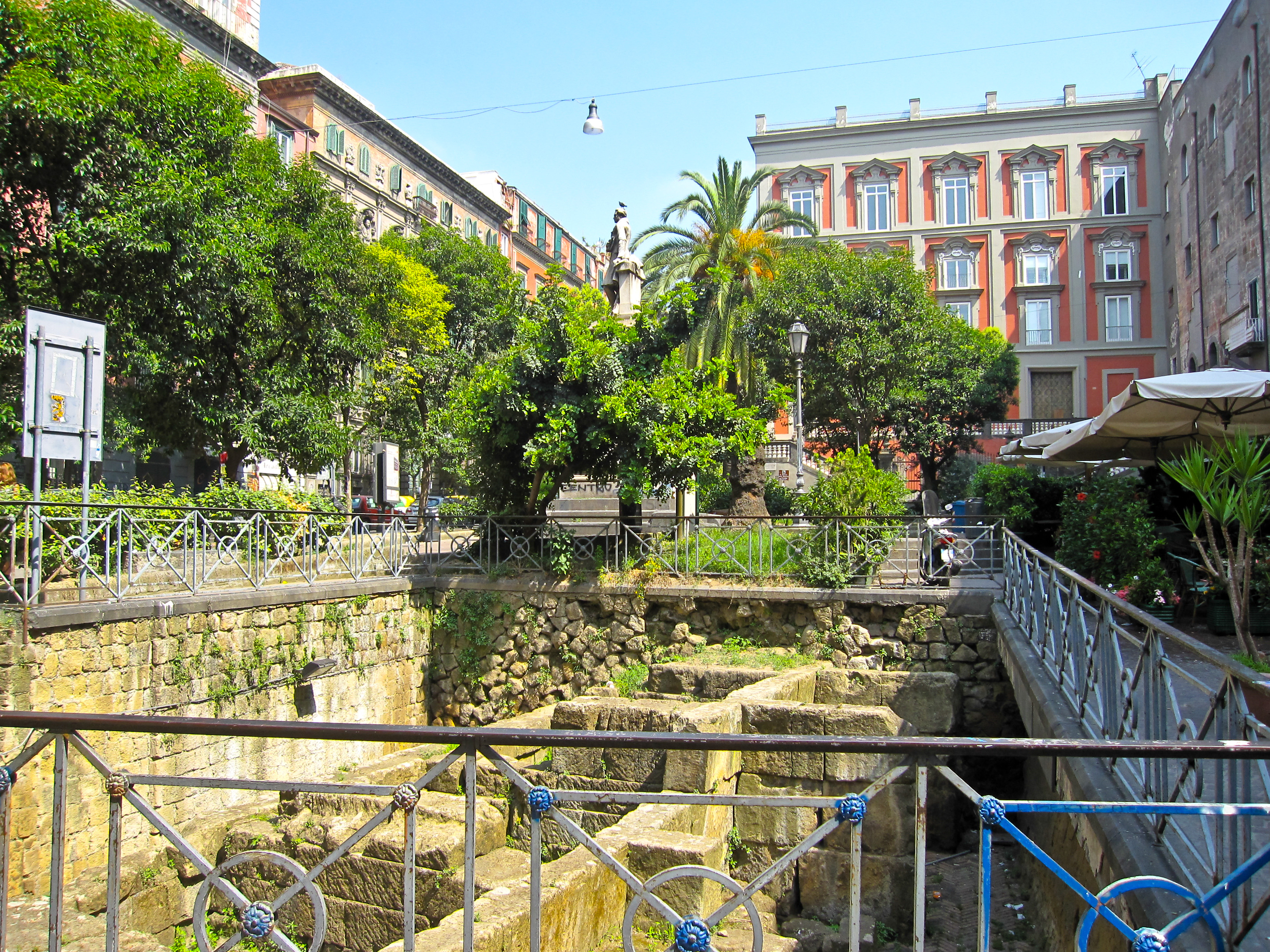
Remains of the ancient Greek city of Neàpolis (now Naples) in Piazza Bellini, Naples

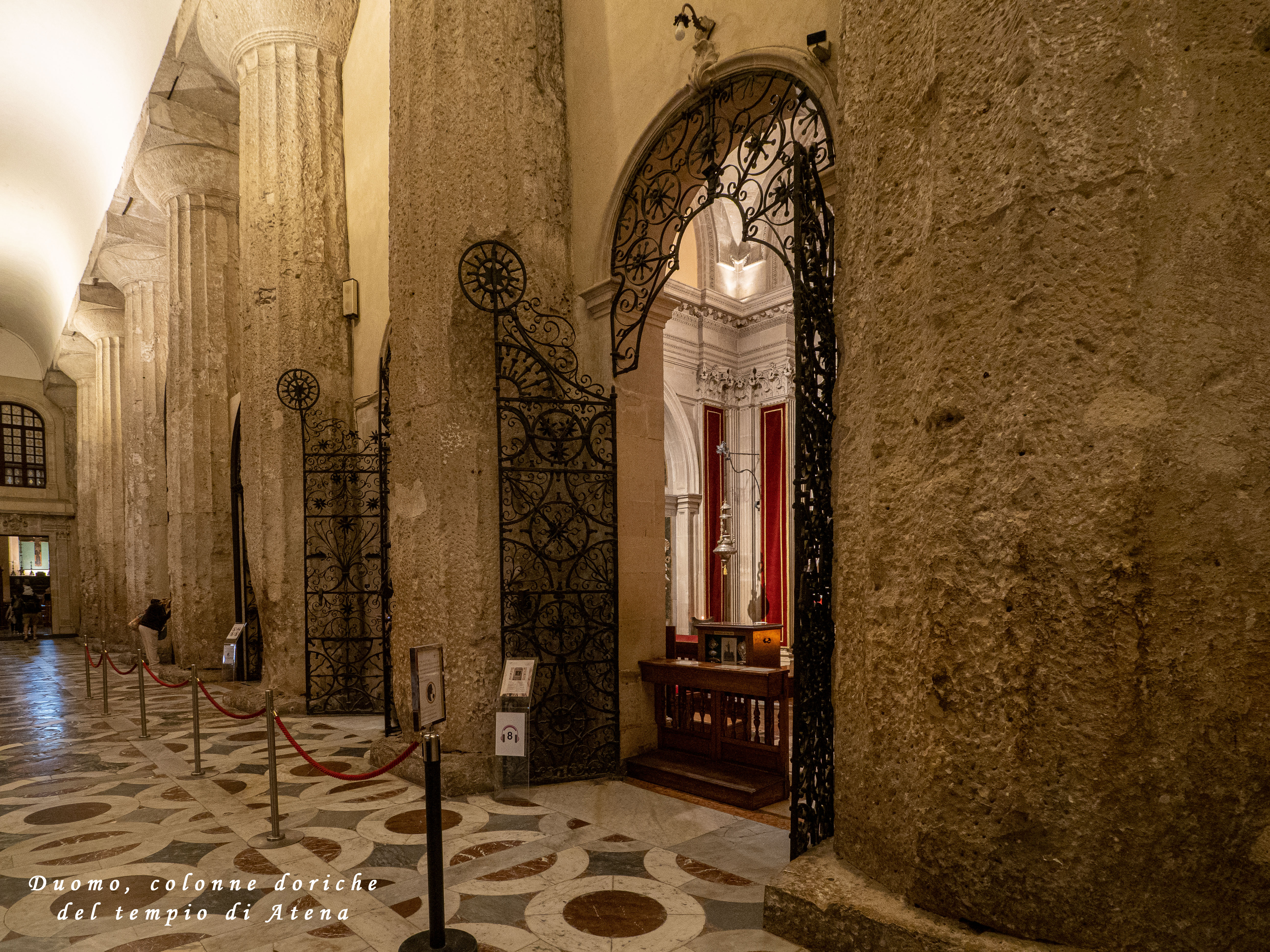
Ancient Doric columns of the Temple of Athena in Syracusae (now Syracuse)

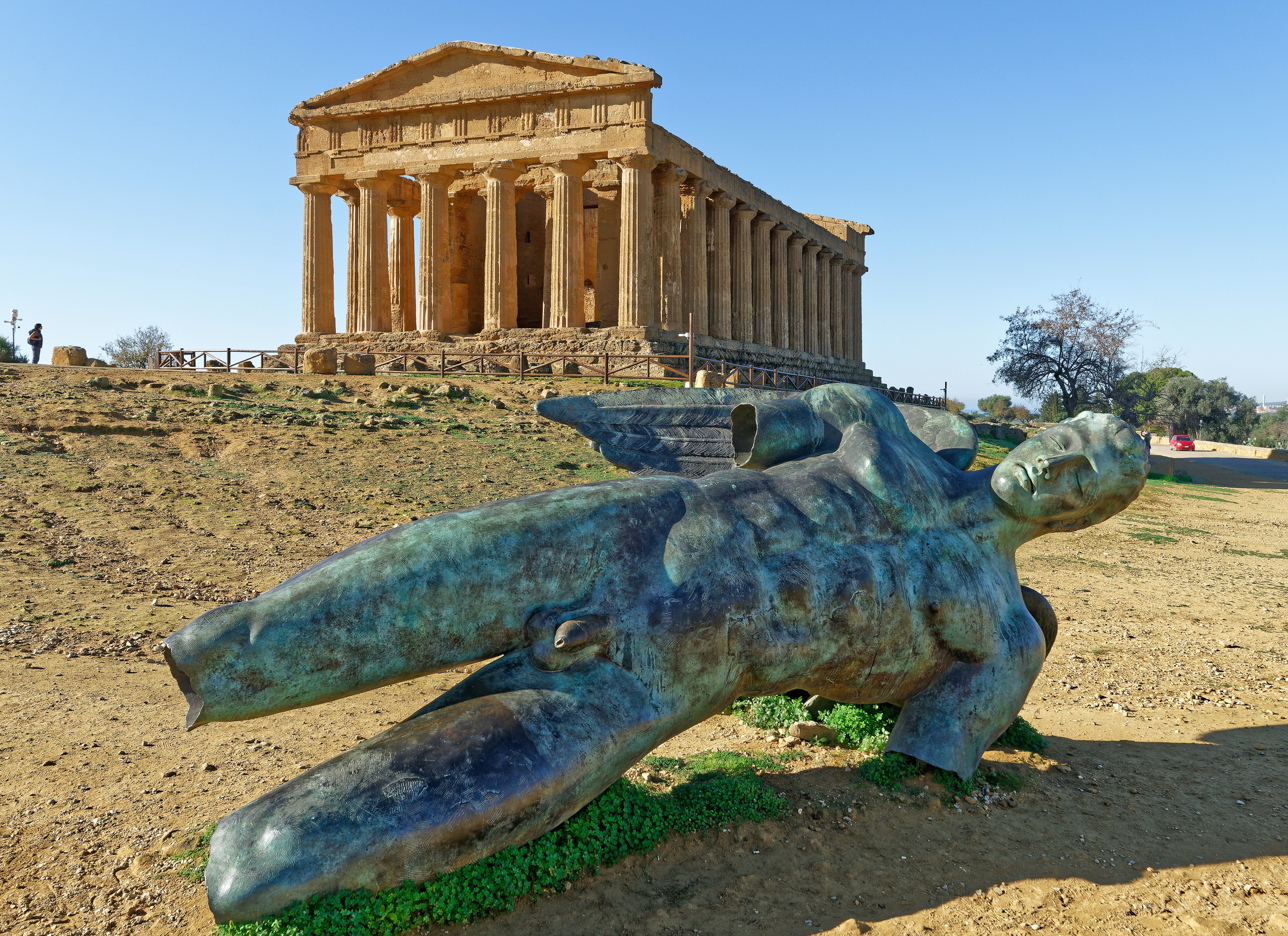
The Temple of Concordia in Akragas (now Agrigento) with a statue of Icarus in the foreground

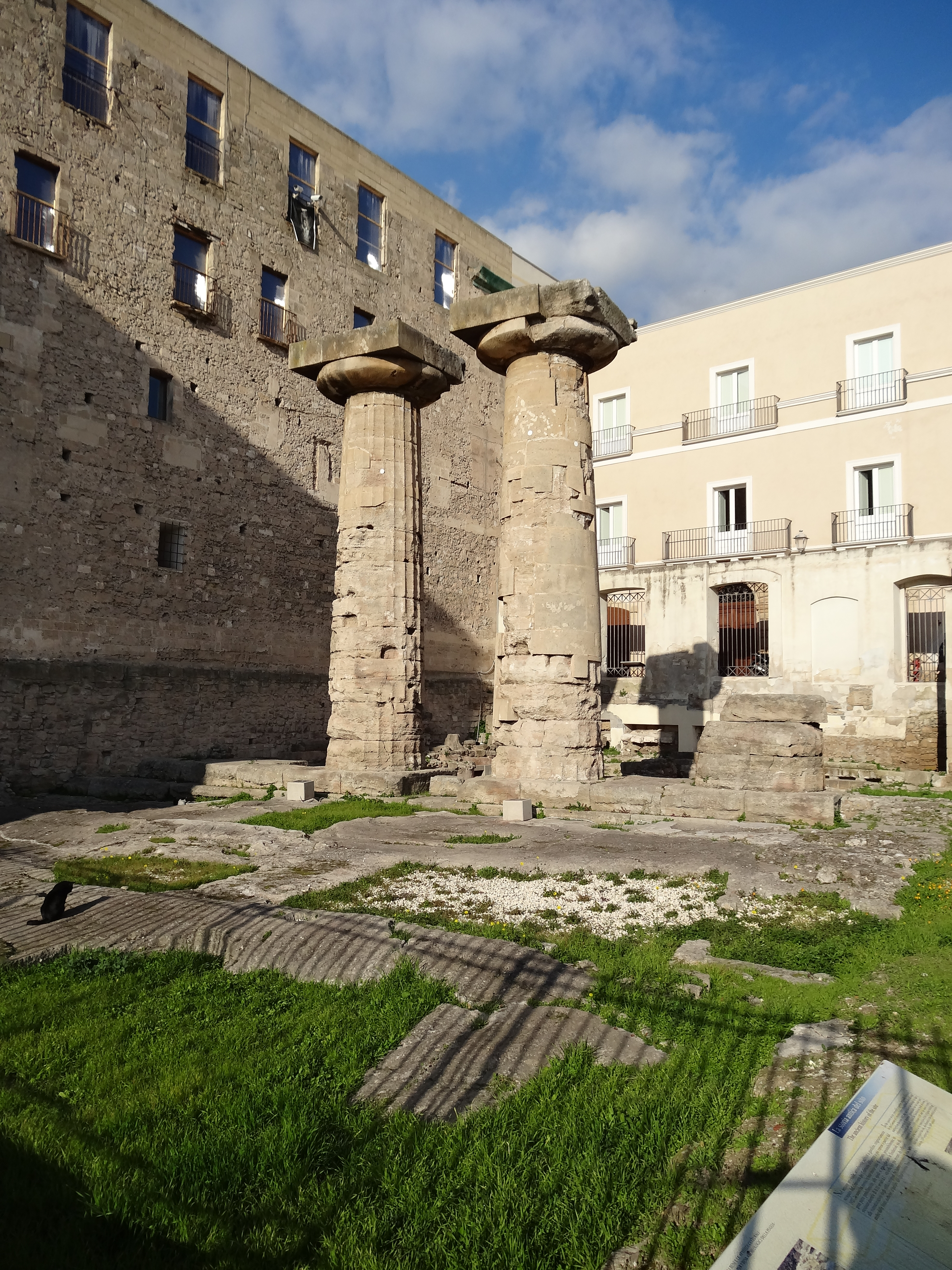
Doric columns from the Temple of Poseidon in Taras (now Taranto); legacy of its Greek origins

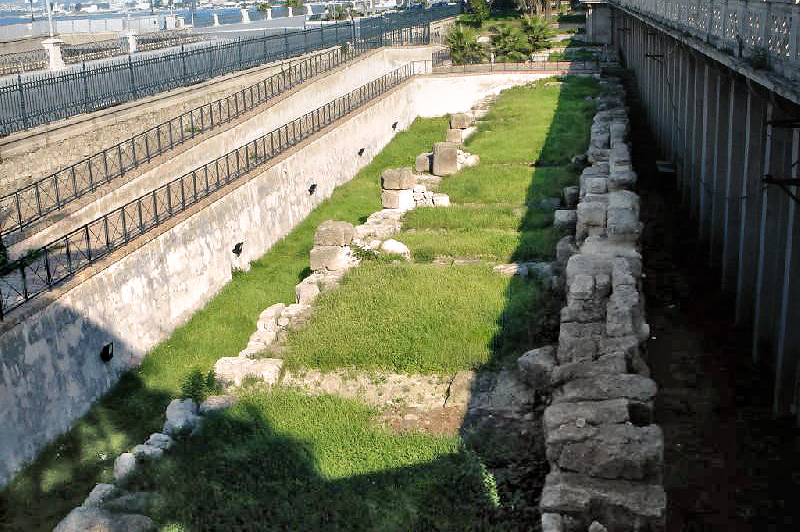
Remains of the ancient Greek city of Rhegium (now Reggio Calabria) along the seafront of Reggio Calabria

==== Secondary colonisation ====
Over time, due to overpopulation and other political and commercial reasons, the new cities expanded their presence in Italy by founding other Greek cities; effectively expanding the Greek civilisation to the whole territory known today as Magna Graecia.

An intense colonisation program was undertaken by Syracuse, at the time of the tyranny of Dionysius I of Syracuse, around 387–385 BC. This phenomenon affected the entire Adriatic coast, and in particular led to the foundation in Italy of Ancón (now Ancona) and Adria; in the Dalmatian coast he saw the foundation of Issa (current Vis), Pharos (Stari Grad), Dimos (Hvar); Lissos (now Lezhë) was founded on the Albanian coast. Issa in turn then founded Tragurium (now Trogir), Melaina Corcyra (now Korčula) and Epetium (now Stobreč, a suburb of Split).

Rhegium (now Reggio Calabria) founded Pyxus (Policastro Bussentino) in Lucania; Locri founded Medma (Rosarno), Polyxena and Hipponium (Vibo Valentia) in present-day Calabria; Sybaris (now Sibari) revitalised the indigenous centres of Laüs and Scydrus in Calabria and founded Poseidonia (Paestum), in Campania; Kroton (now Crotone) founded Terina and participated in the foundation of Caulonia (near Monasterace marina) in Calabria; Messana (now Messina), in collaboration with Rhegium, founded Metaurus (Gioia Tauro); Taras together with Thurii founded Heracleia (Policoro) in Lucania in 434 BC, and also Callipolis ('beautiful city').

=== Expansion and conflict ===
At the beginning of the 6th century BC, all the main cities of Magna Graecia on the Ionian Sea had achieved a high economic and cultural development, which shifted their interests towards expansion of their territory by waging war on neighbouring cities. The 6th century was therefore characterised by great clashes between the colonies. Some of the clashes that established the new balance and the new relationships of force were the Battle of the Sagra river (the clash between Locri Epizefiri and Kroton), the destruction of Siris (by Sybaris and Metapontum), and the clash between Kroton and Sybaris (which ended with the destruction of the latter).

As with all the events of this period precise dates are unknown, but the destruction of Sybaris may have occurred around 510 BC, while the two other clashes are placed around 580–560 BC, with the destruction of Siris before the Battle of the Sagra.

=== Roman era ===
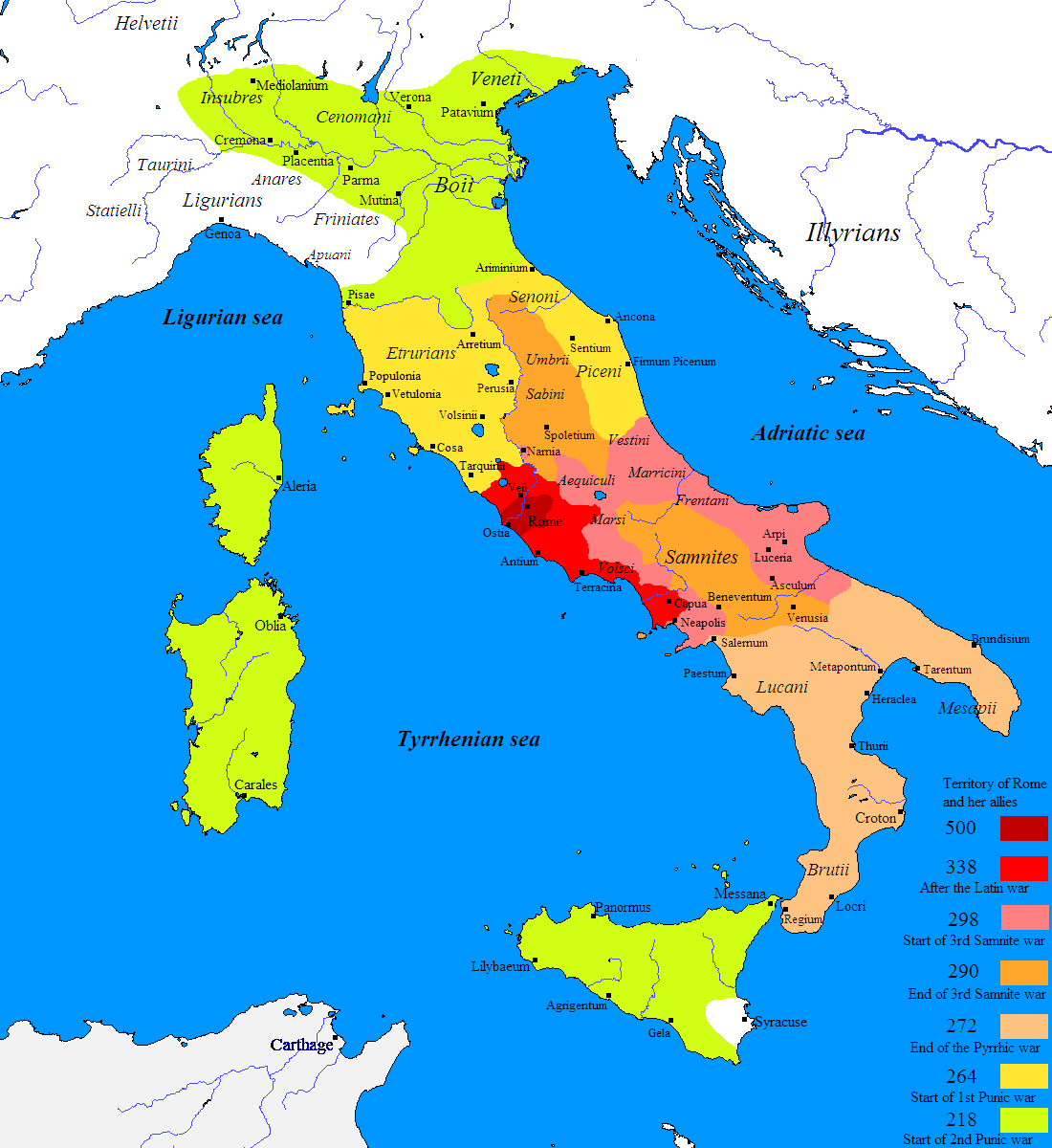
Roman expansion in Italy from 500 BC to 218 BC

The first Greek city to be absorbed into the Roman Republic was Neàpolis in 327 BC.

At the beginning of the 3rd century, Rome was a great power but had not yet entered into conflict with most of Magna Graecia, which had been allies of the Samnites. However, the needs of the Roman populace determined their need for territorial expansion towards the south. As the Greek cities of southern Italy came under threat from the Bruttii and Lucanians from the end of the 4th century BC, they asked for help from Rome, which exploited this opportunity by sending military garrisons in the 280s BC.

Following Rome's victory over Taras after the Pyrrhic War in 272 BC, most of the cities of southern Italy were linked to Rome with pacts and treaties (foedera) which sanctioned a sort of indirect control.

Sicily was conquered by Rome during the First Punic War. Only Syracuse remained independent until 212 because its king Hiero II was a devoted ally of the Romans. His grandson Hieronymus however allied with Hannibal, which prompted the Romans to besiege the city, which fell in 212 BC.

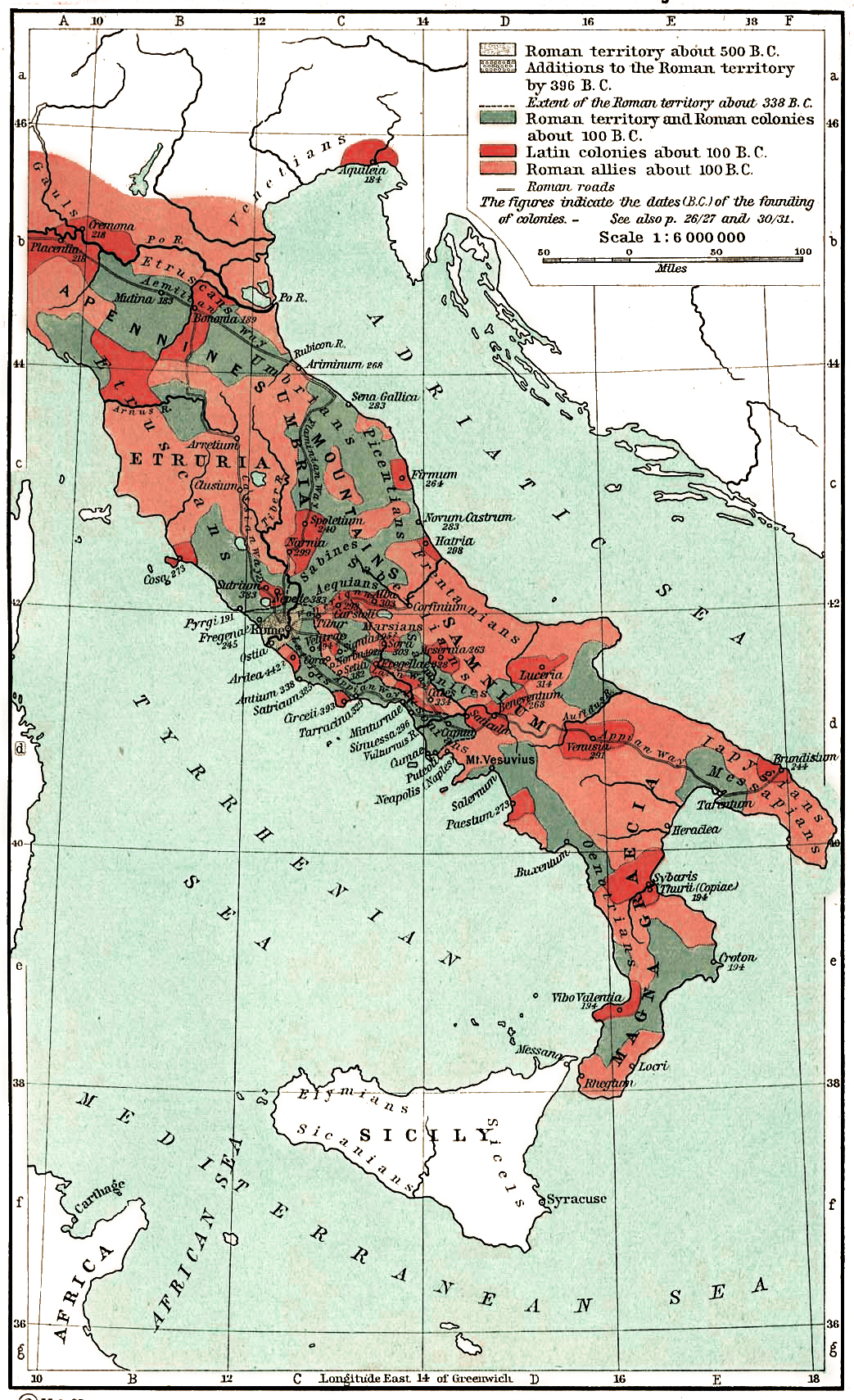
Map of the Roman confederacy in 100 BC, at the advent of the Social War (91–88 BC) Roman territory and colonies Latin colonies Allies of Rome (socii)

After the second Punic War, Rome pursued an unprecedented program of reorganisation in the rest of Magna Graecia, where many of the cities were annexed to the Roman Republic in 205 BC, as a consequence of their defection to Hannibal. Roman colonies (civium romanorum) were the main element of the new territorial control plan starting from the lex Atinia of 197 BC. In 194 BC, garrisons of 300 Roman veterans were implanted in Volturnum, Liternum, Puteoli, Salernum and Buxentum, and to Sipontum on the Adriatic. This model was replicated in the territory of the Brettii; 194 BC saw the foundation of the Roman colonies of Kroton and Tempsa, followed by the Latin colonies of Copia (193 BC) and Valentia (192 BC). Emperor Augustus established six coloniae for Roman veterans in Sicily : Syracuse, Tauromenium, Panormus, Catania, Tyndaris, and Thermae Himerenses. Vast areas of agricultural land, particularly along the island's eastern and northern coasts, were also given to Italian veterans. The influx of Italic peoples represented by these foundations played a decisive role in the spread of Latin language in Sicily.

However, Romanisation was not the same as political unification after the extension of citizenship during the Social Wars in 90/89 BC and considerable variations in cities remained afterwards as late as the Augustan period, depending on their political and social organisation and distance from Rome. Romanisation also depended on the major differences in Rome's treatment of cities, from the early and complete assimilation of Cumae (the only Greek city made a civitas sine suffragio, in 338 BC) and Paestum to the endurance of the Greek language and culture at Naples and Rhegium. The social, linguistic, and administrative changes arising from the Roman conquest only took root in this region by the 1st century AD, while Greek culture remained strong and was actively cultivated as shown by epigraphic evidence.

=== Middle Ages ===
During the Early Middle Ages, following the disastrous Gothic War, new waves of Byzantine Christian Greeks fleeing the Slavic invasion of the Peloponnese settled in Calabria, further strengthened the Hellenic element in the region. The iconoclast emperor Leo III appropriated lands that had been granted to the Papacy in southern Italy and the Eastern Roman (Byzantine) Empire continued to govern the area in the form of the Catapanate of Italy (965–1071) through the Middle Ages, well after northern Italy fell to the Lombards.

At the time of the Normans' late medieval conquest of southern Italy and Sicily (in the late 12th century), the Salento peninsula (the "heel" of Italy), up to one-third of Sicily (concentrated in the Val Demone), and much of Calabria and Lucania were still largely Greek-speaking. Some regions of southern Italy experienced demographic shifts as Greeks began to migrate northwards in significant numbers from regions further south; one such region was Cilento, which came to have a Greek-speaking majority. At this time the language had evolved into medieval Greek, also known as Byzantine Greek, and its speakers were known as Byzantine Greeks. The resultant fusion of local Byzantine Greek culture with Norman and Arab culture (from the Arab occupation of Sicily) gave rise to Norman-Arab-Byzantine culture in Sicily.

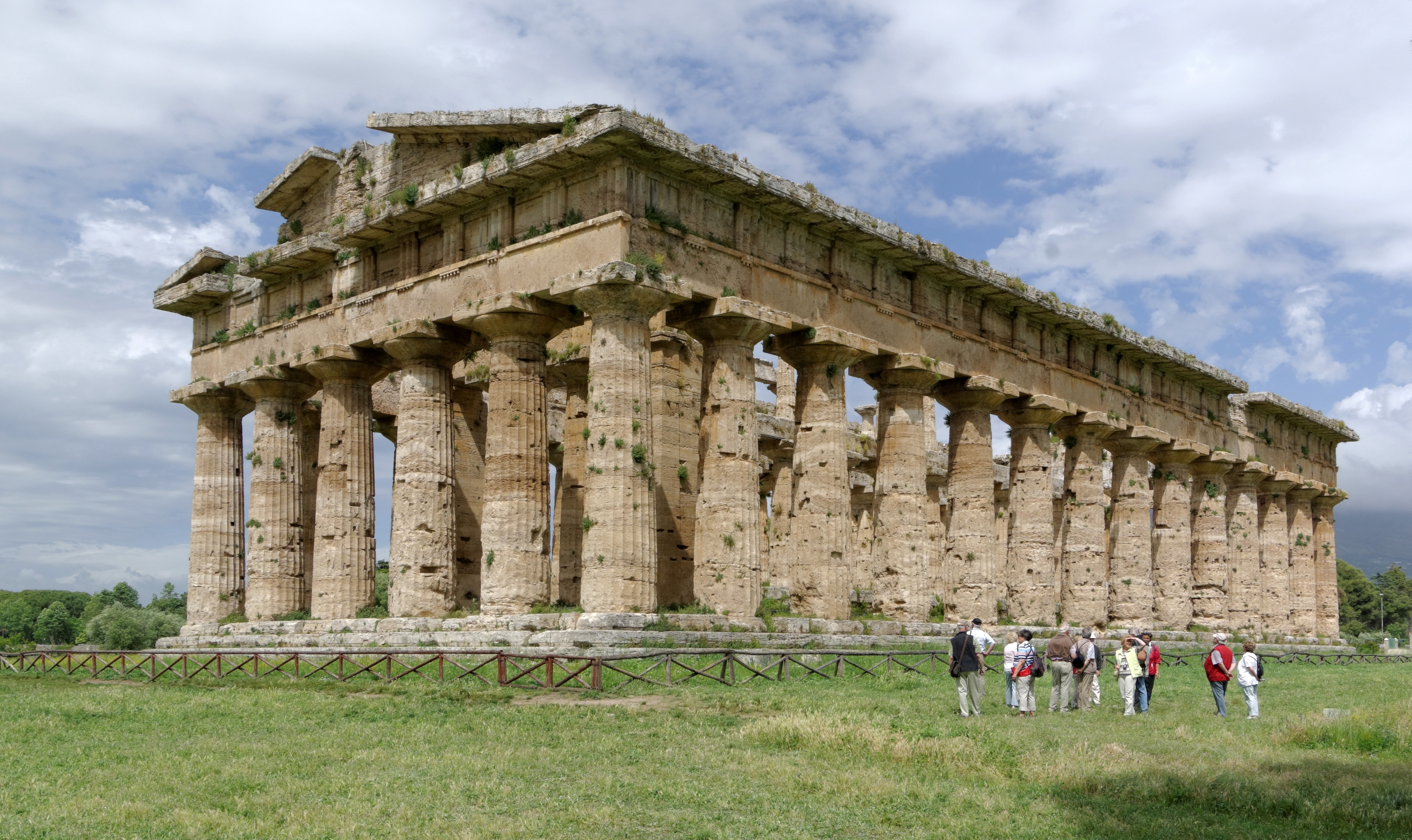
Greek temples of Paestum, Campania

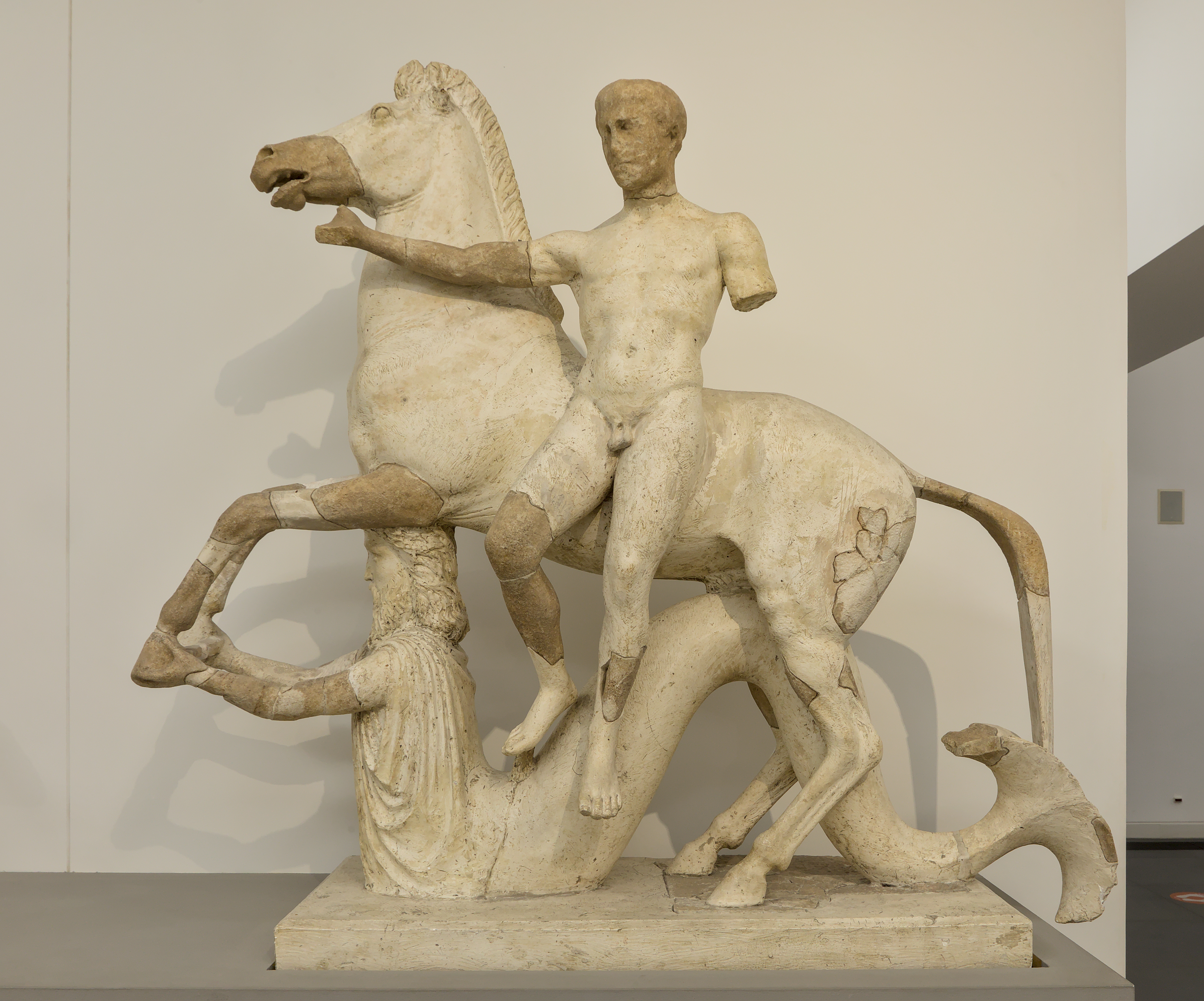
Right statue from the Dioscuri group from Locri exhibited in the National Museum of Magna Graecia in Reggio Calabria

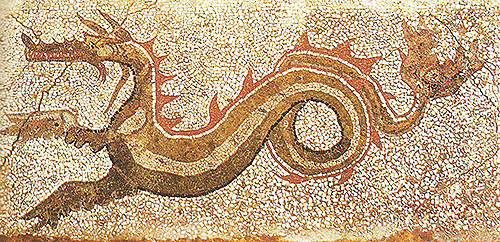
Mosaic from Caulonia, Calabria, National Museum of Magna Graecia

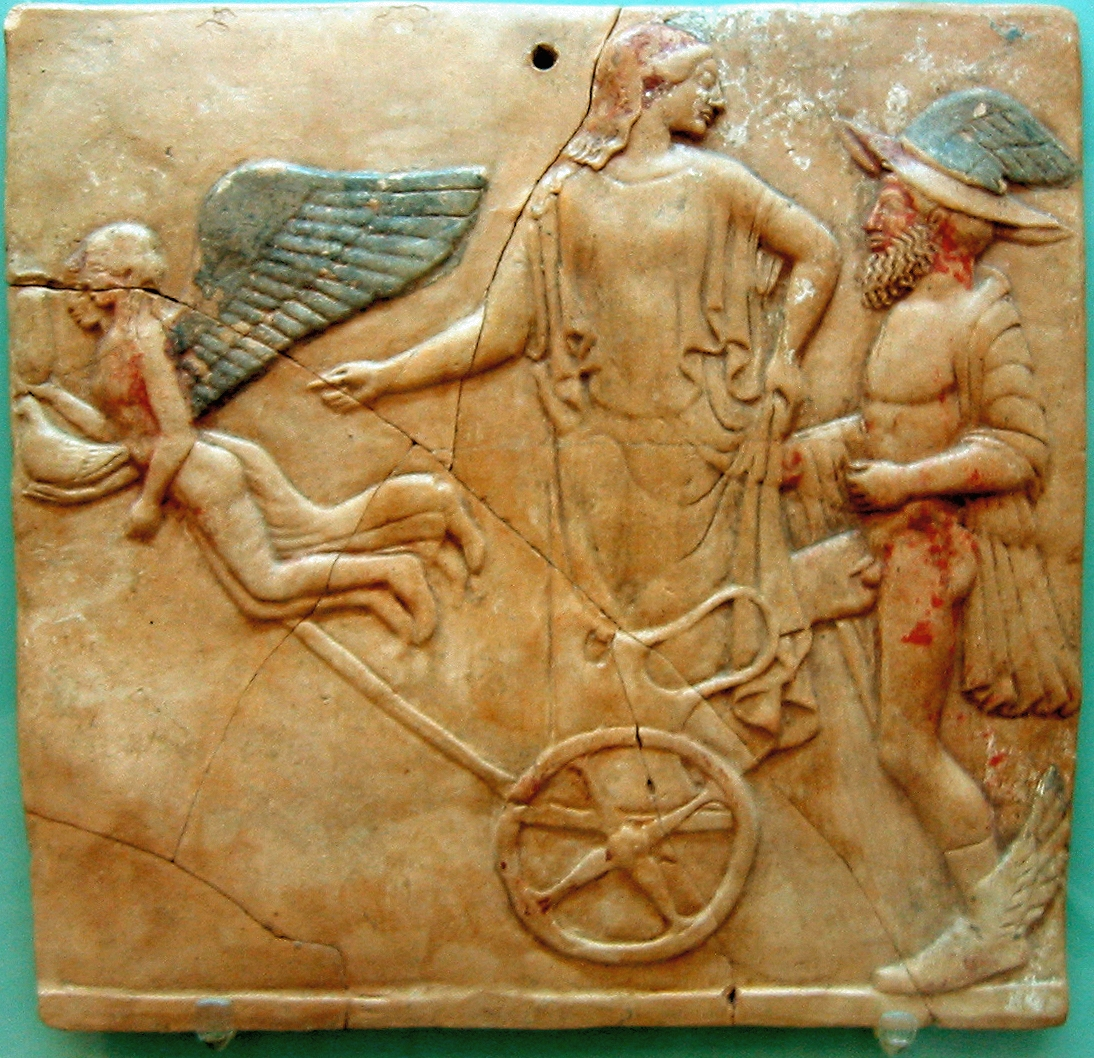
Pinax of Eros, Hermes and Aphrodite exhibited in the National Museum of Magna Graecia

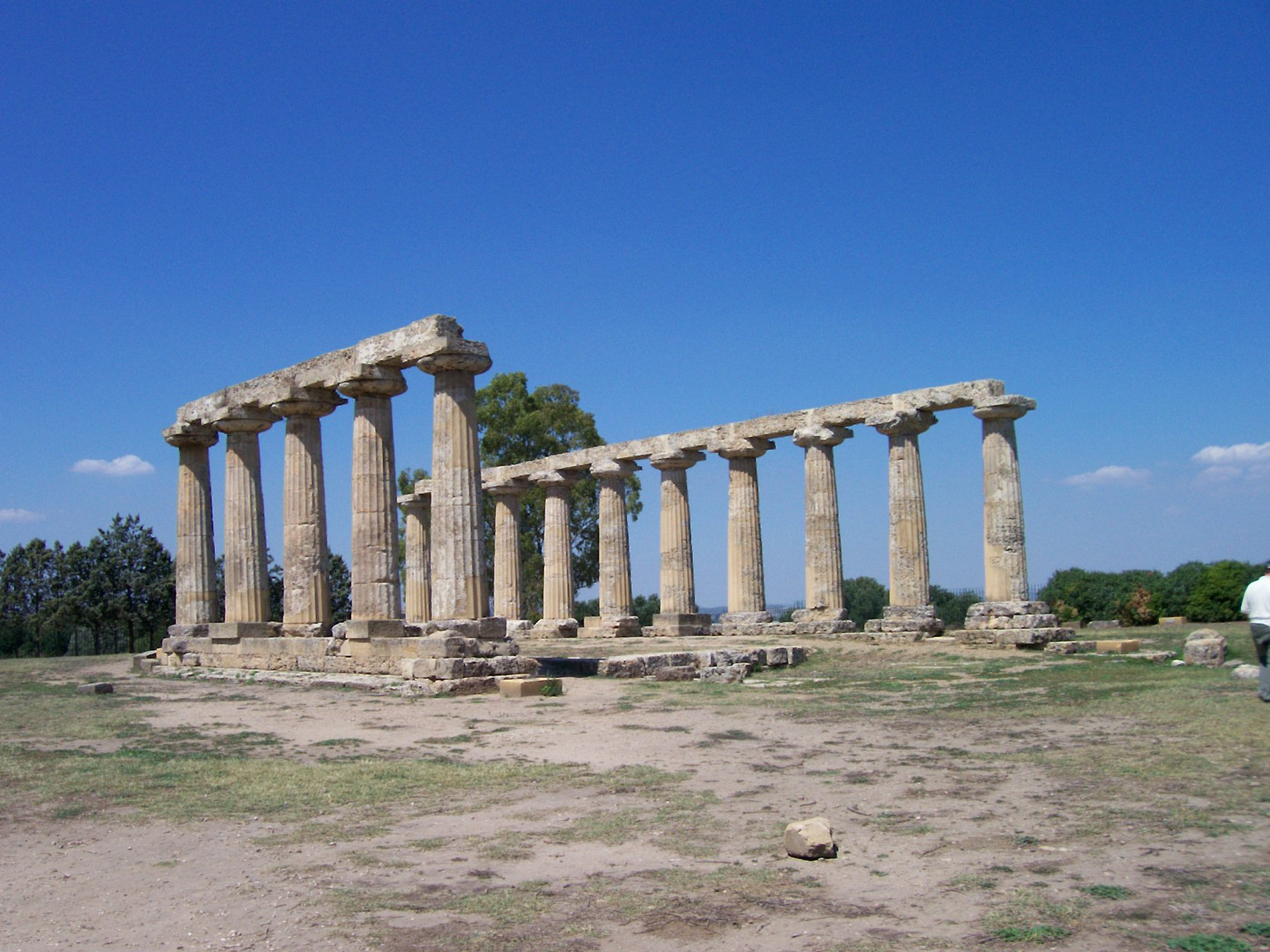
Temple of Hera in Metaponto, Basilicata

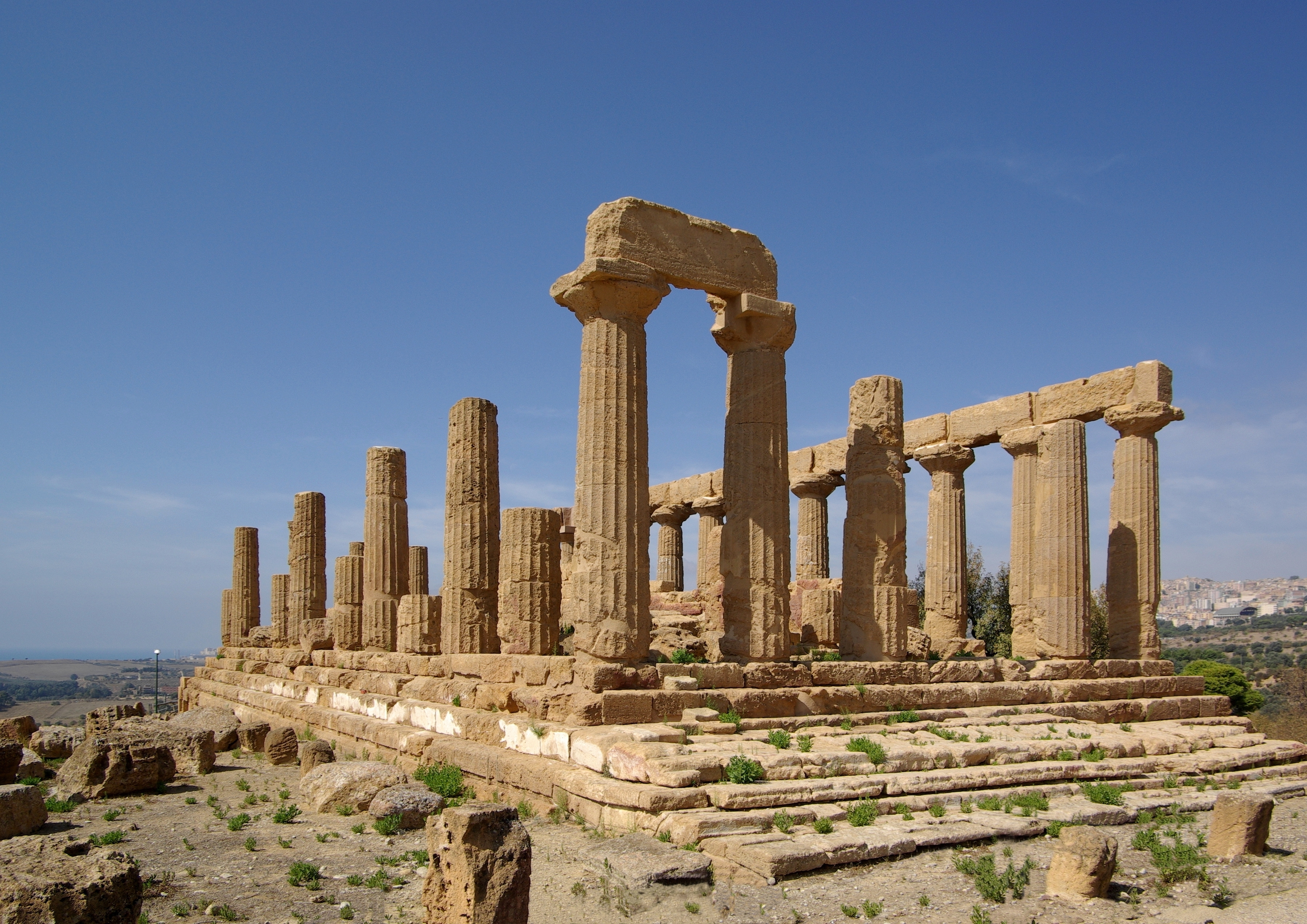
The Temple "D", Valle dei Templi, Agrigento, Sicily

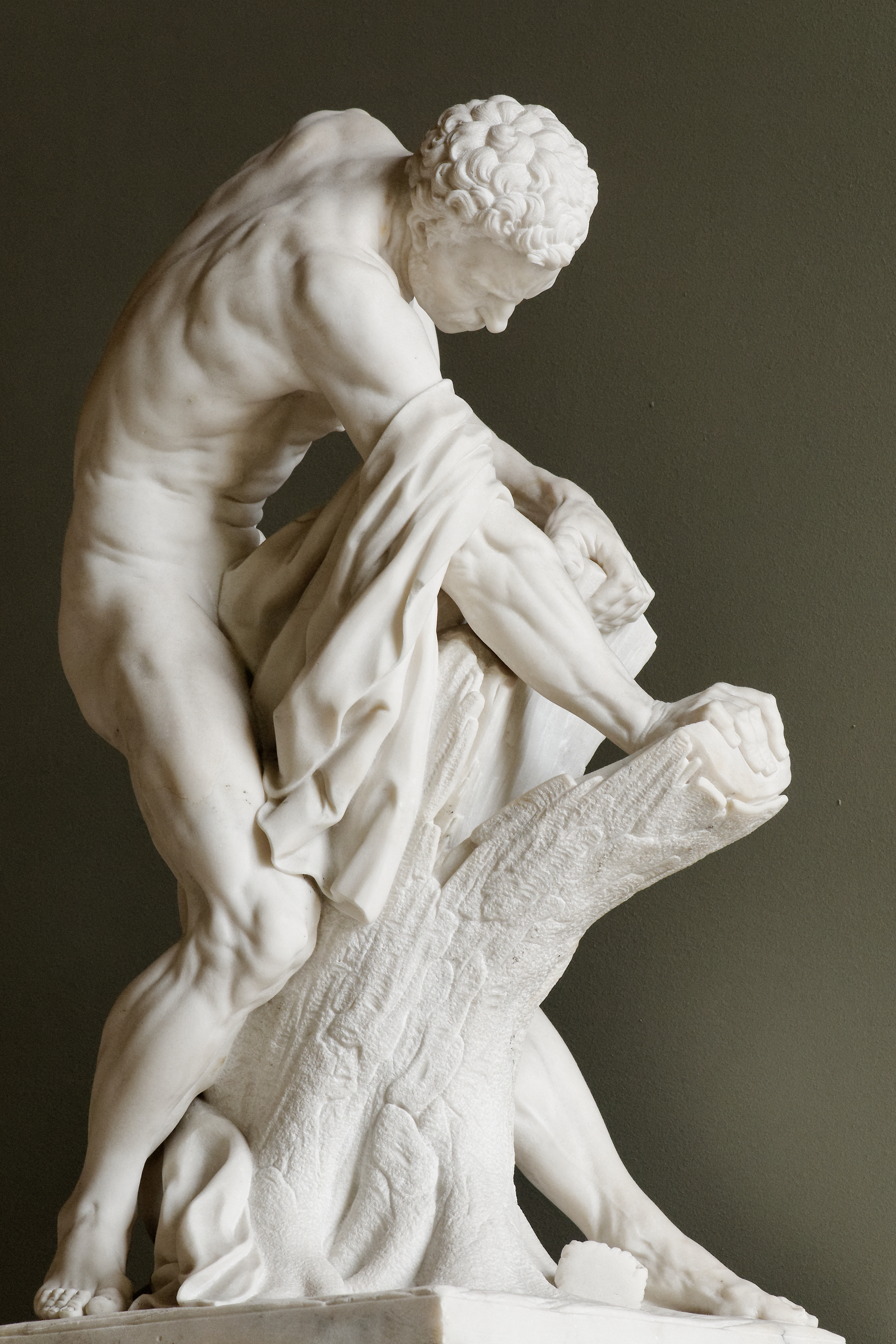
Milo of Croton

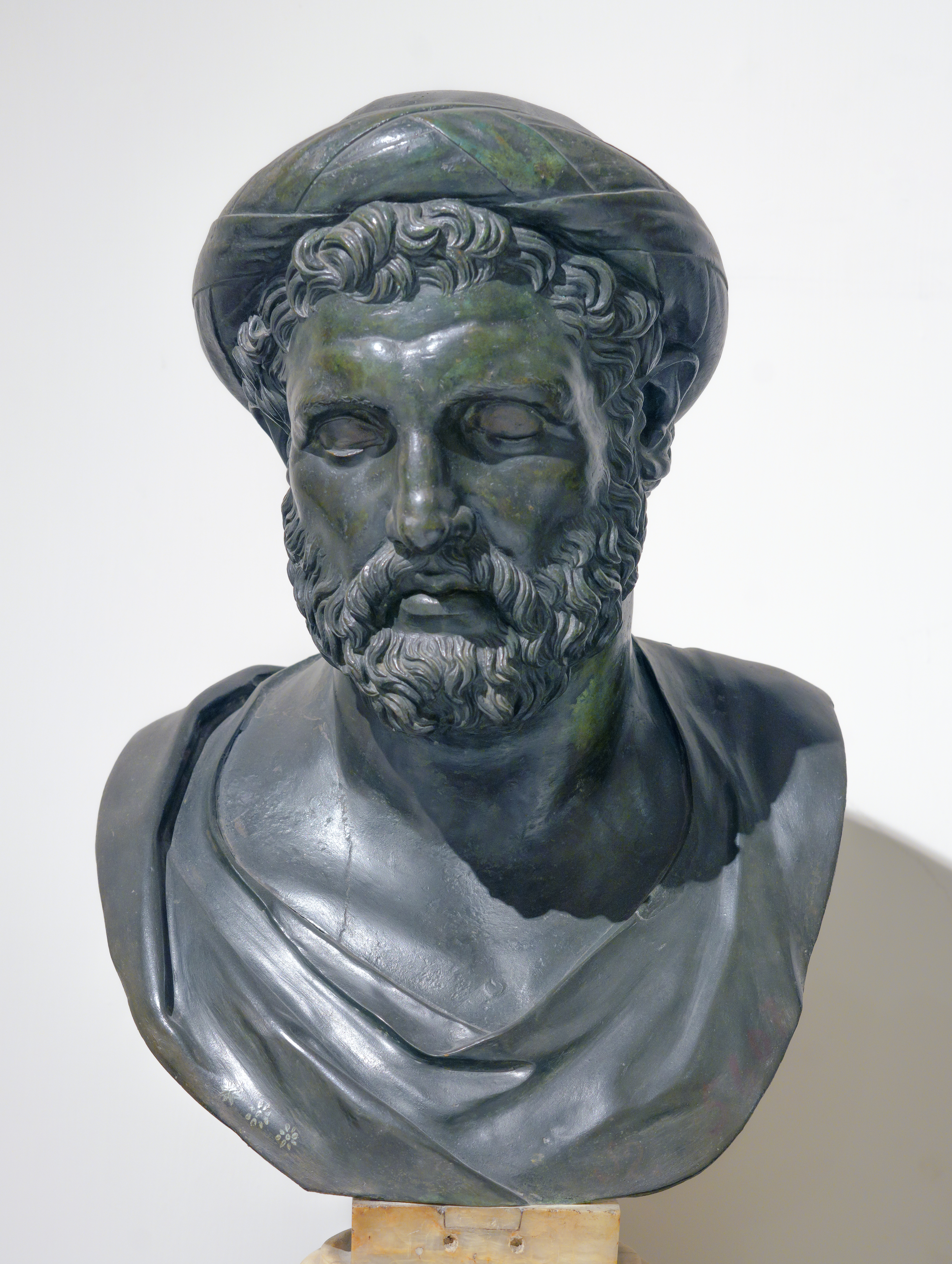
Archytas of Taras

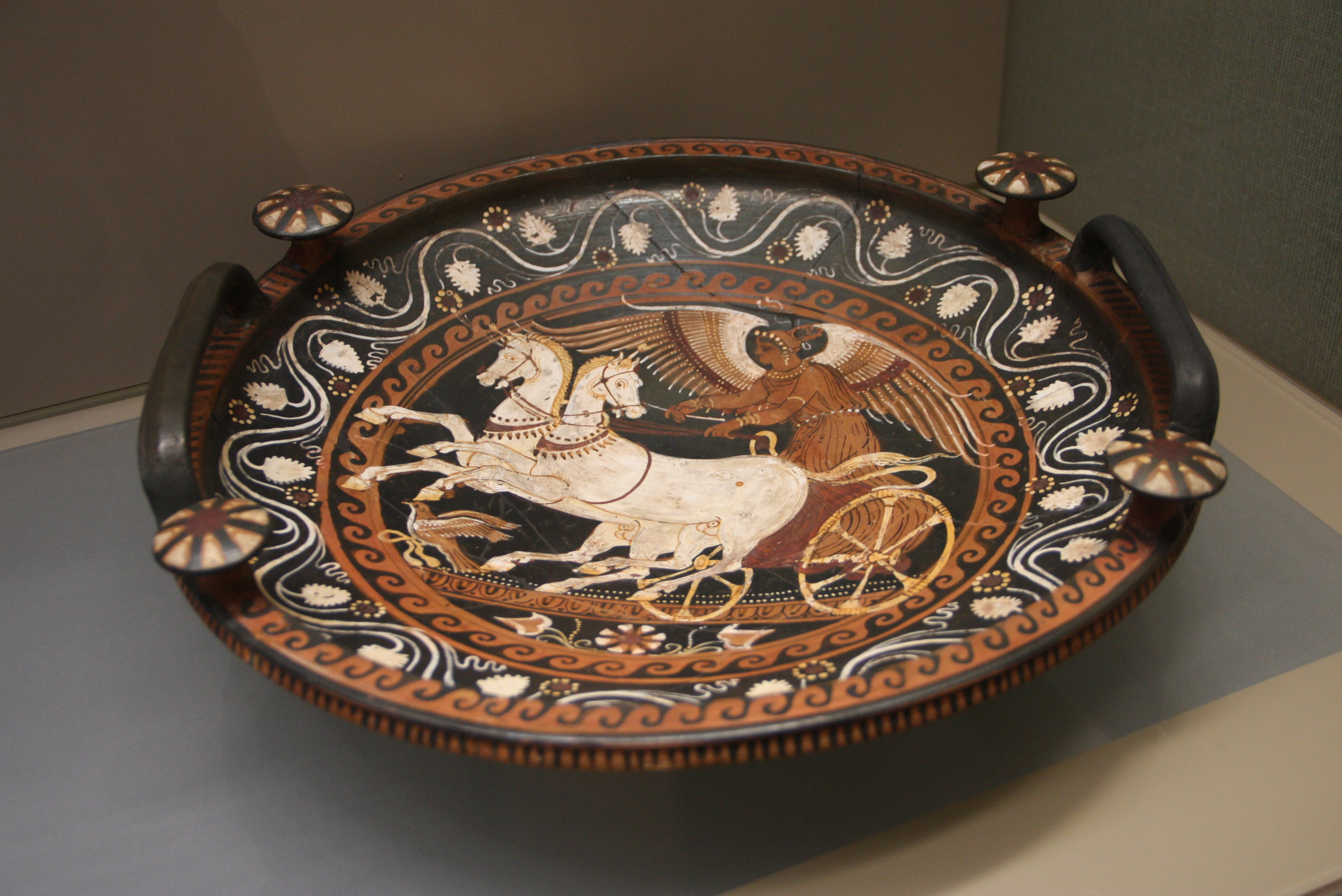
The goddess Nike riding on a two-horse chariot, Apulian patera (tray), 4th century BC, Archaeological Museum of Milan

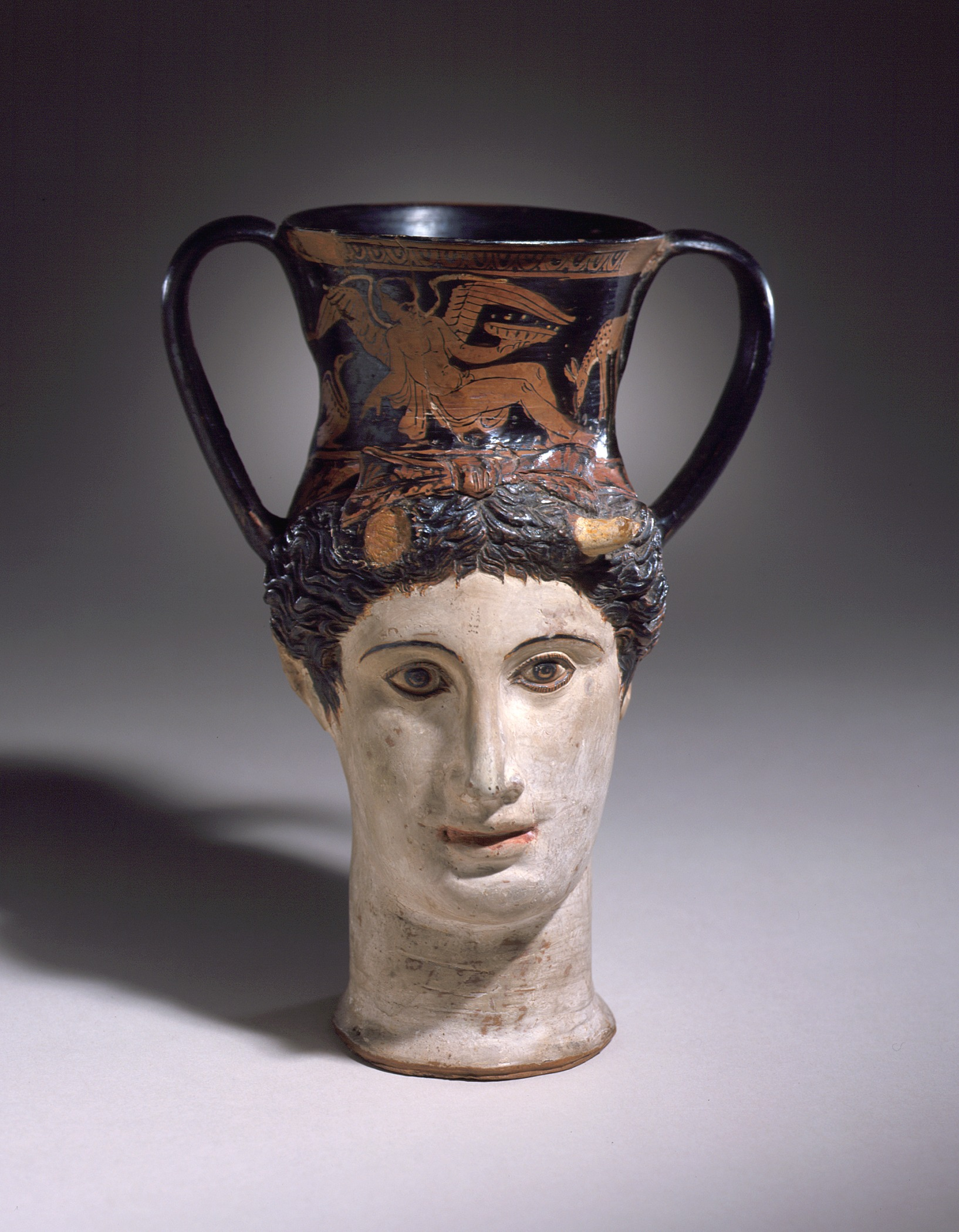
Head-Kantharos of a female faun or Io, red-figure pottery, 375–350 BC, Los Angeles County Museum of Art

== List of Greek poleis ==
=== Southern mainland Italy ===
This is a list of the 22 poleis ("city-states") in Italy, according to Mogens Herman Hansen. It does not list all the Hellenic settlements, only those organised around a polis structure.

Ancient name(s)	Location	Modern name(s)	Foundation date	Mother city	Founder(s)
Herakleia (Lucania)	Basilicata	(abandoned)	433–432 BC	Taras (and Thourioi)	Unknown
Hipponion	Calabria	Vibo Valentia	late 7th century BC	Lokroi Epizephiroi	Unknown
Hyele, or Elea, Velia (Roman name)	Campania	(abandoned)	c.540–535 BC	Phokaia, Massalia	Refugees from Alalie
Kaulonia	Calabria	(abandoned)	7th century BC	Kroton	Typhon of Aigion
Kroton	Calabria	Crotone	709–708 BC	Rhypes, Achaia	Myscellus
Kyme, Cumae (Roman name)	Campania	(abandoned)	c.750–725 BC	Chalkis and Eretria	Hippokles of Euboian Kyme and Megasthenes of Chalkis
Laos	Calabria	(abandoned)	before 510 BC	Sybaris	Refugees from Sybaris
Lokroi (Epizephiroi)	Calabria	Locri	early 7th century BC	Lokris	Unknown
Medma	Calabria	(abandoned)	7th century BC	Lokroi Epizephiroi	Unknown
Metapontion	Basilicata	Metaponto	c. 630 BC	Achaia	Leukippos of Achaia
Metauros	Calabria	Gioia Tauro	7th century BC	Zankle (or possibly Lokroi Epizephiroi)	Unknown
Neàpolis	Campania	Naples	6th–5th centuries BC (previously an 8th-century BC harbour of Kyme known as Parthenope)	Kyme	Unknown
Pithekoussai	Campania	Ischia	8th century BC	Chalkis and Eretria	Unknown
Poseidonia, Paestum (Roman name)	Campania	(abandoned)	c. 600 BC	Sybaris (and perhaps Troizen)	Unknown
Pyxous	Campania	Policastro Bussentino	471–470 BC	Rhegion and Messena	Mikythos, tyrant of Rhegion and Messena
Rhegion	Calabria	Reggio Calabria	8th century BC	Chalkis (with Zankle and Messenian refugees)	Antimnestos of Zankle (or perhaps Artimedes of Chalkis)
Siris	Basilicata	(abandoned)	c. 660 BC (or c. 700 BC)	Kolophon	Refugees from Kolophon
Sybaris	Calabria	Sibari	721–720 (or 709–708) BC	Achaia and Troizen	Is of Helike
Taras	Apulia	Taranto	c. 706 BC	Sparta	Phalanthos and the Partheniai
Temesa	unknown, but in Calabria	(abandoned)	no Greek founder (Ausones who became Hellenised)		
Terina	Calabria	(abandoned)	before 460 BC, perhaps c. 510 BC	Kroton	Unknown
Thourioi	Calabria	(abandoned)	446 and 444–443 BC	Athens and many other cities	Lampon and Xenokrates of Athens

=== Sicily ===
This is a list of the 46 poleis ("city-states") in Sicily, according to Mogens Herman Hansen. It does not list all the Hellenic settlements, only those organised around a polis structure.

Ancient name(s)	Location	Modern name(s)	Foundation date	Mother city	Founder(s)
Abakainon	Metropolitan City of Messina	(abandoned)	no Greek founder (Sicels who became Hellenised)		
Adranon	Metropolitan City of Catania	Adrano	c.400 BC	Syrakousai	Dionysios I
Agyrion	Province of Enna	Agira	no Greek founder (Sicels who became Hellenised)		
Aitna	Metropolitan City of Catania	on the site of Katane	476 BC	Syrakousai	Hieron
Akragas	Province of Agrigento	Agrigento	c.580 BC	Gela	Aristonoos and Pystilos
Akrai	Province of Syracuse	near Palazzolo Acreide	664 BC	Syrakousai	Unknown
Alaisa	Metropolitan City of Messina	Tusa	403–402 BC	Herbita	Archonides of Herbita
Alontion, Haluntium (Roman name)	Metropolitan City of Messina	San Marco d'Alunzio	no Greek founder (Sicels who became Hellenised)		
Apollonia	Metropolitan City of Messina	Monte Vecchio near San Fratello	405–367 BC	Syrakousai	Possibly Dionysios I
Engyon	Province of Enna	Troina?	no Greek founder (Sicels who became Hellenised)		
Euboia	Metropolitan City of Catania	Licodia Eubea	7th century BC, perhaps late 8th century BC	Leontinoi	Unknown
Galeria	Unknown	(abandoned)	no Greek founder (Sicels who became Hellenised)		
Gela	Province of Caltanissetta	Gela	689–688 BC	Rhodes (Lindos), Cretans	Antiphemos of Rhodes and Entimos the Cretan
Heloron	Province of Syracuse	(abandoned)	Unknown	Syrakousai	Unknown
Henna	Province of Enna	Enna	no Greek founder (Sicels who became Hellenised)		
Herakleia Minoa	Province of Agrigento	Cattolica Eraclea	after 628 BC	Selinous, Sparta	refounded by Euryleon after c.510 BC
Herakleia	unlocated in Western Sicily	(abandoned)	c.510 BC	Sparta	Dorieus
Herbessos	Province of Enna	Montagna di Marzo	no Greek founder (Sicels who became Hellenised)		
Herbita	Unknown	(abandoned)	no Greek founder (Sicels who became Hellenised)		
Himera	Province of Palermo	Termini Imerese	648 BC	Zankle, exiles from Syrakousai	Eukleides, Simos and Sakon
Hippana	Province of Palermo	Monte dei Cavalli	no Greek founder (indigenous settlement that became Hellenised)		
Imachara	Metropolitan City of Catania	Mendolito	no Greek founder (Sicels who became Hellenised)		
Kallipolis	Unknown	(abandoned)	late 8th century BC	Naxos (Sicily)	Unknown
Kamarina	Province of Ragusa	Santa Croce Camerina	c.598 BC	Syrakousai, Korinth	Daskon of Syracuse and Menekolos of Corinth
Kasmenai	Province of Syracuse	(abandoned)	644–643 BC	Syrakousai	Unknown
Katane	Metropolitan City of Catania	Catania	729 BC	Naxos (Sicily)	Euarchos
Kentoripa	Province of Enna	Centuripe	no Greek founder (Sicels who became Hellenised)		
Kephaloidion	Province of Palermo	Cefalù	no Greek founder (Sicels who became Hellenised)		
Leontinoi	Province of Syracuse	Lentini	729 BC	Naxos (Sicily)	Theokles?
Lipara	Metropolitan City of Messina	Lipari	580–576 BC	Knidos, Rhodes	Pentathlos, Gorgos, Thestor and Epithersides
Longane	Metropolitan City of Messina	near Rodì Milici	no Greek founder (Sicels who became Hellenised)		
Megara Hyblaea	Province of Syracuse	Augusta	728 BC	Megara Nisaia	Theokles?
Morgantina	Province of Enna	near Aidone	no Greek founder (Sicels who became Hellenised)		
Mylai	Metropolitan City of Messina	Milazzo	700 BC?	Zankle	Unknown
Nakone	Unknown	(abandoned)	no Greek founder (Sicels who became Hellenised)		
Naxos	Metropolitan City of Messina	Giardini Naxos	735–734 BC	Chalkis, Naxos (Cyclades)	Theokles
Petra	Unknown	(abandoned)	no Greek founder (indigenous settlement that became Hellenised)		
Piakos	Metropolitan City of Catania	Mendolito?	no Greek founder (Sicels who became Hellenised)		
Selinous	Province of Trapani	Marinella di Selinunte	628–627 BC	Megara Hyblaea	Pammilos
Sileraioi	Unknown	(abandoned)	no Greek founder (indigenous settlement that became Hellenised)		
Stielanaioi	Metropolitan City of Catania?	(abandoned)	no Greek founder (indigenous settlement that became Hellenised)		
Syrakousai	Province of Syracuse	Syracuse	733 BC	Korinth	Archias of Korinth
Tauromenion	Metropolitan City of Catania	Taormina	392 BC	Syrakousai	perhaps Dionysios I
Tyndaris	Metropolitan City of Messina	Tindari	396 BC	Syrakousai	Dionysios I
Tyrrhenoi	Province of Palermo?	Alimena?	no Greek founder (indigenous settlement that became Hellenised)		
Zankle/Messana	Metropolitan City of Messina	Messina	c.730	Chalkis, Kyme	Perieres of Kyme and Krataimenes of Chalkis

=== Italian Greek colonies outside Magna Graecia ===
Ancient name(s)	Location	Modern name(s)	Foundation date	Mother city	Founder(s)
Adrìa	Veneto	Adria	385 BC	Syrakousai	Diomedes, hypostasis of Dionysius I of Syracuse
Ankón	Marches	Ancona	387 BC	Syrakousai	Diomedes, hypostasis of Dionysius I of Syracuse

== Administration ==
The administrative organisation of Magna Graecia was inherited from the Hellenic poleis, taking up the concept of "city-states" administered by the aristocracy. The cities of Magna Graecia were independent like the Greek poleis of the motherland, and had an army and a military fleet. There were also cases of tyranny as in Syracuse, governed by the tyrant Dionysius, who fought the Carthaginians until his death.

== Economy ==
In the cities of Magna Graecia, trade, agriculture and crafts developed. Initially oriented to the indigenous Italic populations, the trade was immediately an excellent channel of exchange with the Greeks of the motherland, even if today it is difficult to establish precisely the type of goods traded and the volume of these exchanges.

== Coinage ==
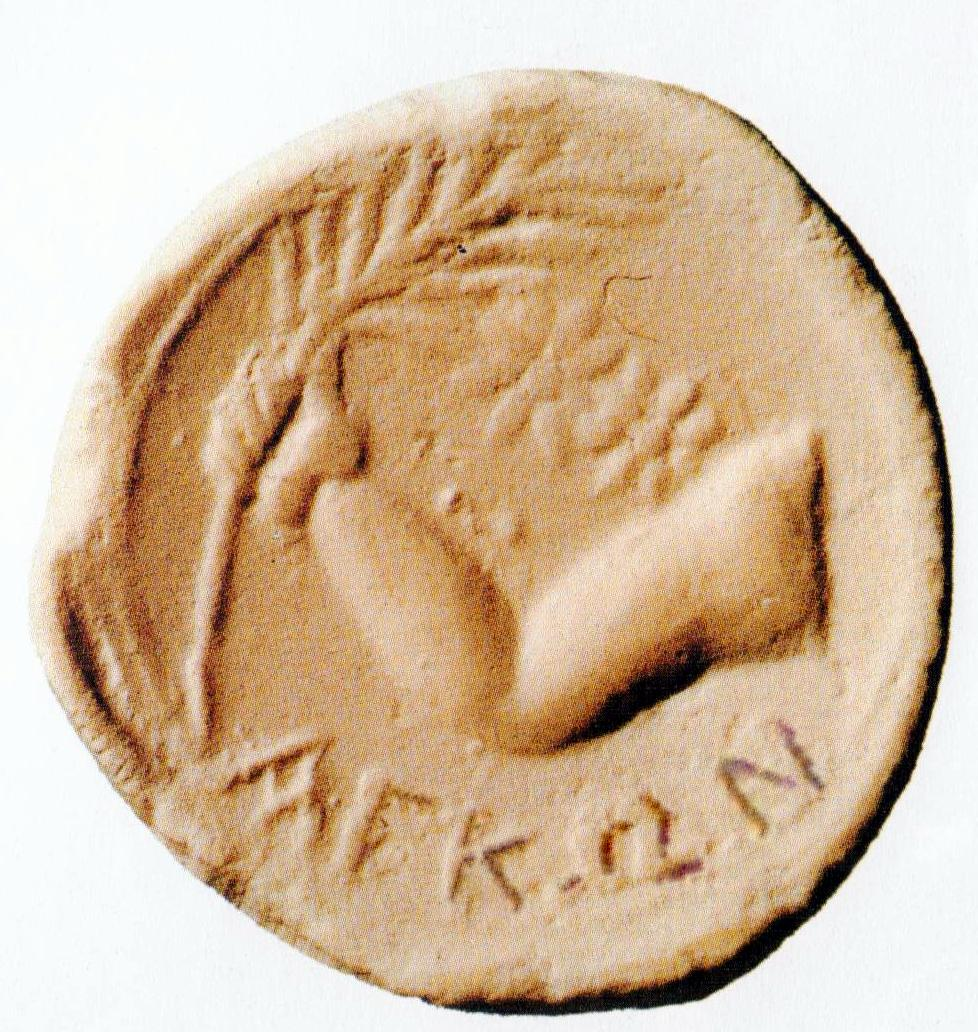
4th-century BC Greek coins of Ankón (now Ancona)

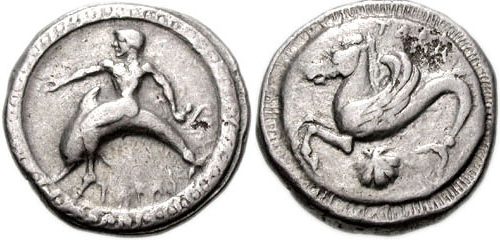
5th-century BC Greek coins of Taras (now Taranto) with the eponym Taras hero riding a dolphin

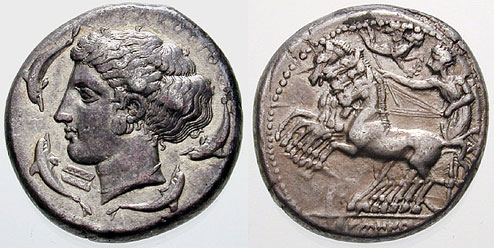
A Syracusan tetradrachm (c. 415–405 BC), sporting Arethusa and a quadriga.

Greek coinage of Italy and Sicily originated from local Italiotes and Siceliotes who formed numerous city-states. These Hellenistic communities descended from Greek migrants. Southern Italy was so thoroughly Hellenized that it was known as the Magna Graecia. Each of the polities struck their own coinage.

Taras (or Tarentum) was among the most prominent city-states.

By the second century BC, some of these Greek coinages evolved under Roman rule, and can be classified as the first Roman provincial currencies.

== Culture ==
The Greek colonists of Magna Graecia elaborated a civilization, which had peculiar characteristics, due to the distance from the motherland and the influence of the indigenous peoples of southern Italy. From the motherland Greece, art, literature and philosophy decisively influenced the life of the colonies. In Magna Graecia much impetus was given to culture, especially in some cities, such as Taras (now Taranto). Pythagoras moved to Crotone where he founded his school in 530 BC. Among others, Aeschylus, Herodotus, Xenophanes and Plato visited Magna Graecia.

Among the illustrious characters born in Magna Graecia are the philosophers Parmenides of Elea, Zeno of Elea, Gorgias of Lentini and Empedocles of Agrigento; the Pythagoreans Philolaus of Crotone, Archytas of Taranto, Lysis of Taranto, Echecrates and Timaeus of Locri; the mathematician Archimedes of Syracuse; the poets Theocritus of Syracuse, Stesichorus, Ibycus of Reggio Calabria, Nossis of Locri, Alexis of Thuri and Leonidas of Taranto; the doctors Alcmeon of Crotone and Democedes of Crotone; the sculptor from Reggio Clearchus; the painter Zeuxis, the musicologist Aristoxenus of Taranto and the legislator Zaleucus of Locri.

=== Language ===
A remnant of Greek influence can be found in the survival of the Greek language in some villages of the above-mentioned Salento peninsula (the "heel" of Italy). This living dialect of Greek, known locally as Griko, is found in the Italian regions of Calabria and Apulia. Griko is considered by linguists to be a descendant of Byzantine Greek, which had been the majority language of Salento through the Middle Ages, combining also some ancient Doric and local romance elements. There is a rich oral tradition and Griko folklore, limited now but once numerous, to around 30,000 people, most of them having abandoned their language in favour of Italian. Some scholars, such as Gerhard Rohlfs, argue that the origins of Griko may ultimately be traced to the colonies of Magna Graecia.

=== Art and architecture ===
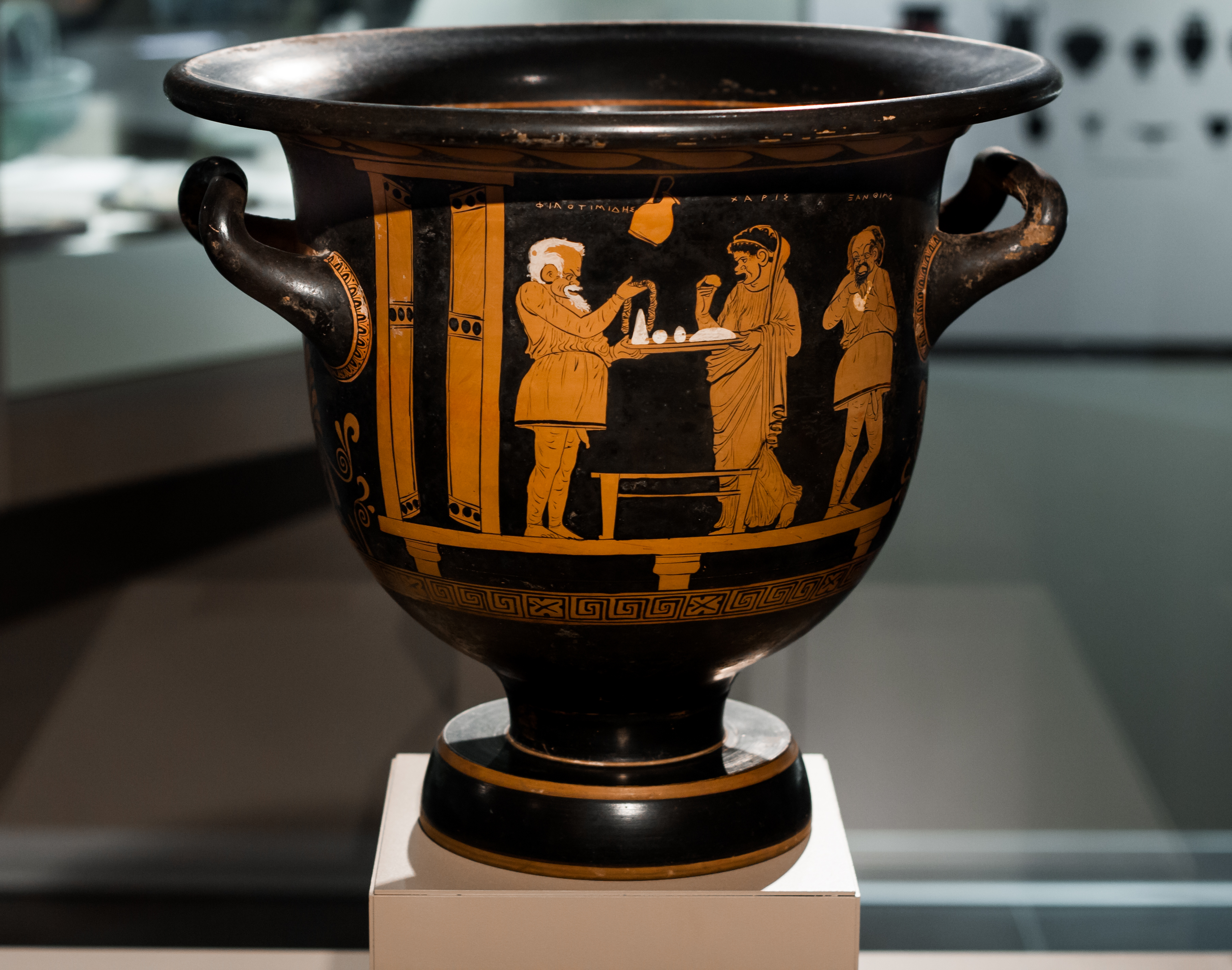
Apulian pottery exhibited in the Archaeological Museum of Milan, 380–370 BC

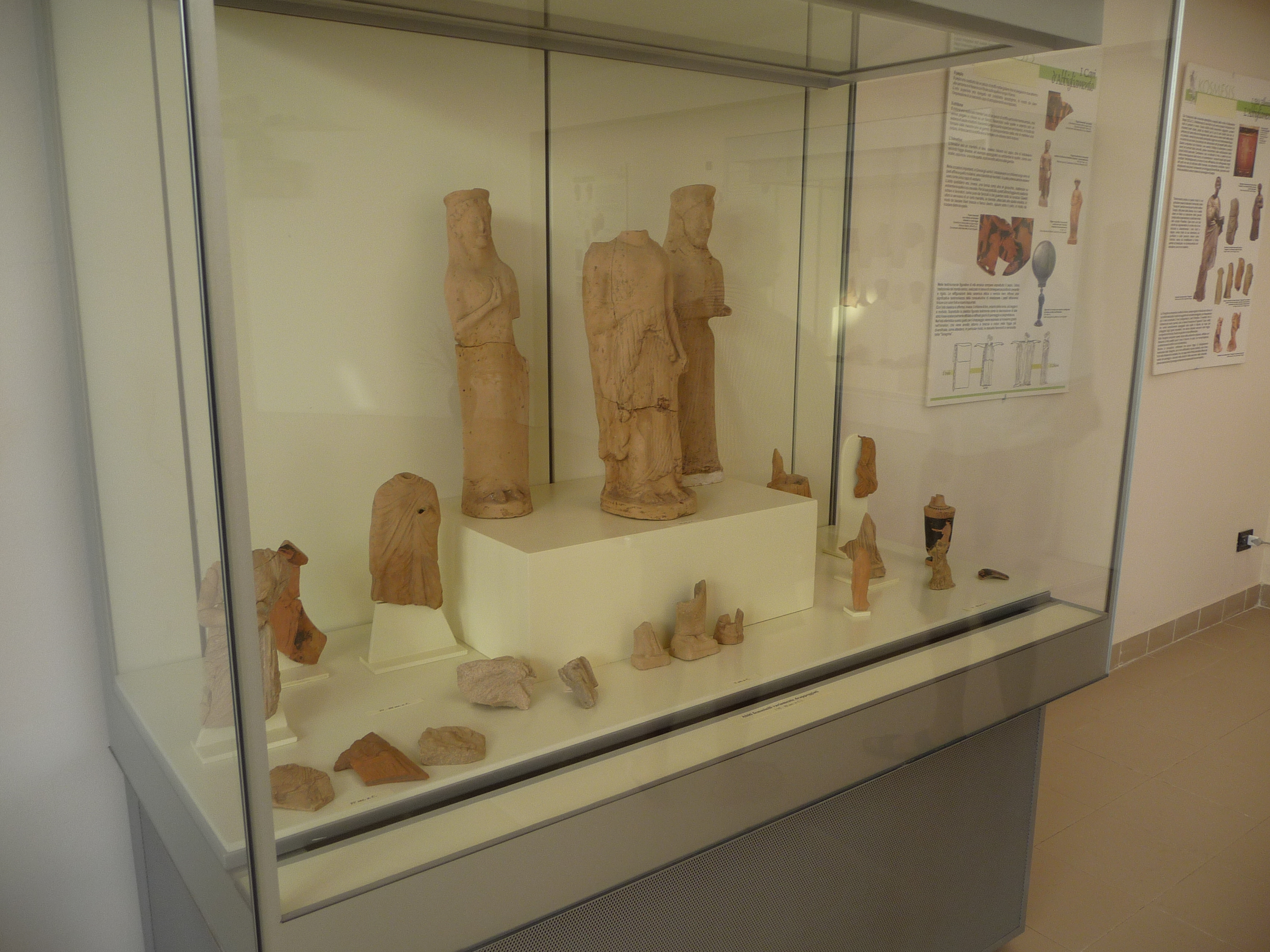
Archaeological finds exhibited in the Monasterace Archeological Museum

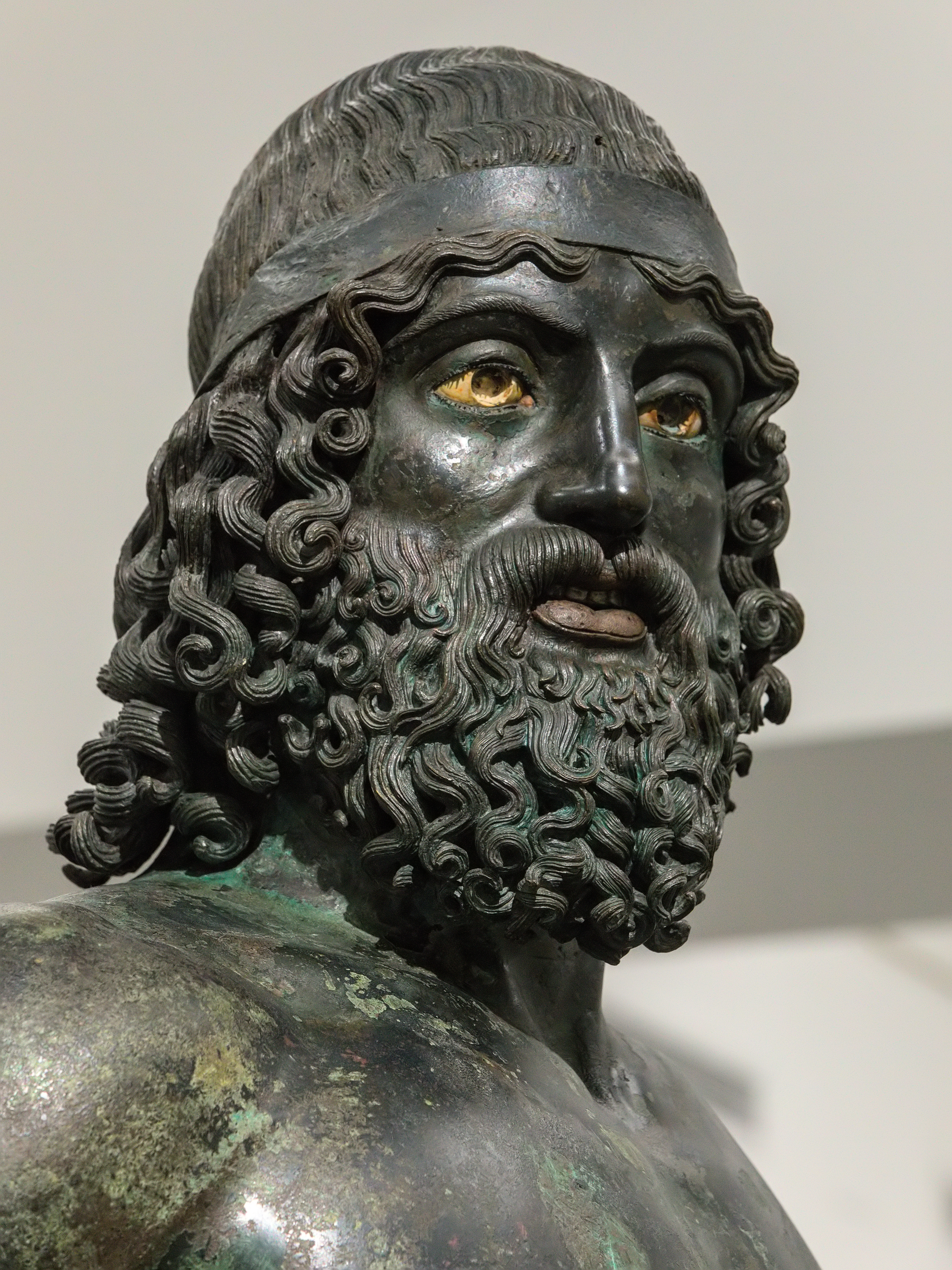
One of the two Riace Bronzes exhibited in the National Museum of Magna Graecia in Reggio Calabria

Magna Graecia, in some fields such as architecture and urban planning, sometimes surpassed the mother country and the other Greek colonies. In Magna Graecia, as well as in the other Greek colonies, the Doric style enriched with showy decorations was adopted as the dominant architectural style. In Magna Graecia, in particular, a Doric style influenced by the Ionic one was also used, especially in Sicily in the Achaean colonies. In Magna Graecia, limestone was used as a building material due to the difficulty in finding other materials. The Doric style in Magna Graecia reached its apogee, surpassing that of the motherland and the other Greek colonies.

Regarding urban planning, the cities of Magna Graecia, as well as many cities of Greek colonies in other regions, were more orderly and rational in the distribution of spaces than those of the mother country, making the urban fabric more practical. The first examples of urbanistically more rational Greek cities belonged to Magna Graecia, in this case Taranto, Metapontum and Megara Hyblaea. Characteristic of this new urban concept, which later spread also in the motherland to Rhodes and Miletus, was a checkerboard road network.

In Magna Graecia painting and sculpture also reached a notable level of quality. In Magna Graecia there were examples of excellence in sculpture, coroplastics and bronzes. As for vase painting, many famous Athenian potters moved to Magna Graecia creating works influenced by the culture of the place, making their paintings peculiar and different from those of the motherland, giving rise to the South Italian ancient Greek pottery. Also noteworthy are the mosaics, the goldsmith's art and wall painting.

Noteworthy sculptures from Magna Graecia are the Apollo of Gaza, the Apollo of Piombino, the Dancing Satyr of Mazara del Vallo, the Head of a Philosopher and the Riace bronzes, while notable vases from Magna Graecia are the Darius Vase and the Nestor's Cup. Noteworthy temples of Magna Graecia are the Temple of Concordia, Agrigento, the Temple of Hera Lacinia, the Temple of Heracles, Agrigento, The Temple of Juno in Agrigento, the Temple of Olympian Zeus, Agrigento, the Temple of Apollo (Syracuse), the Temple of Athena (Syracuse), the Temple of Athena (Paestum), the Temple C (Selinus), the Temple E (Selinus), the Temple F (Selinus), the Temple of Juno Lacinia (Crotone), the Second Temple of Hera (Paestum), the Heraion at Foce del Sele, the Temple of Poseidon (Taranto), the Tavole Palatine and the Temple of Victory (Himera).

=== Theatre ===
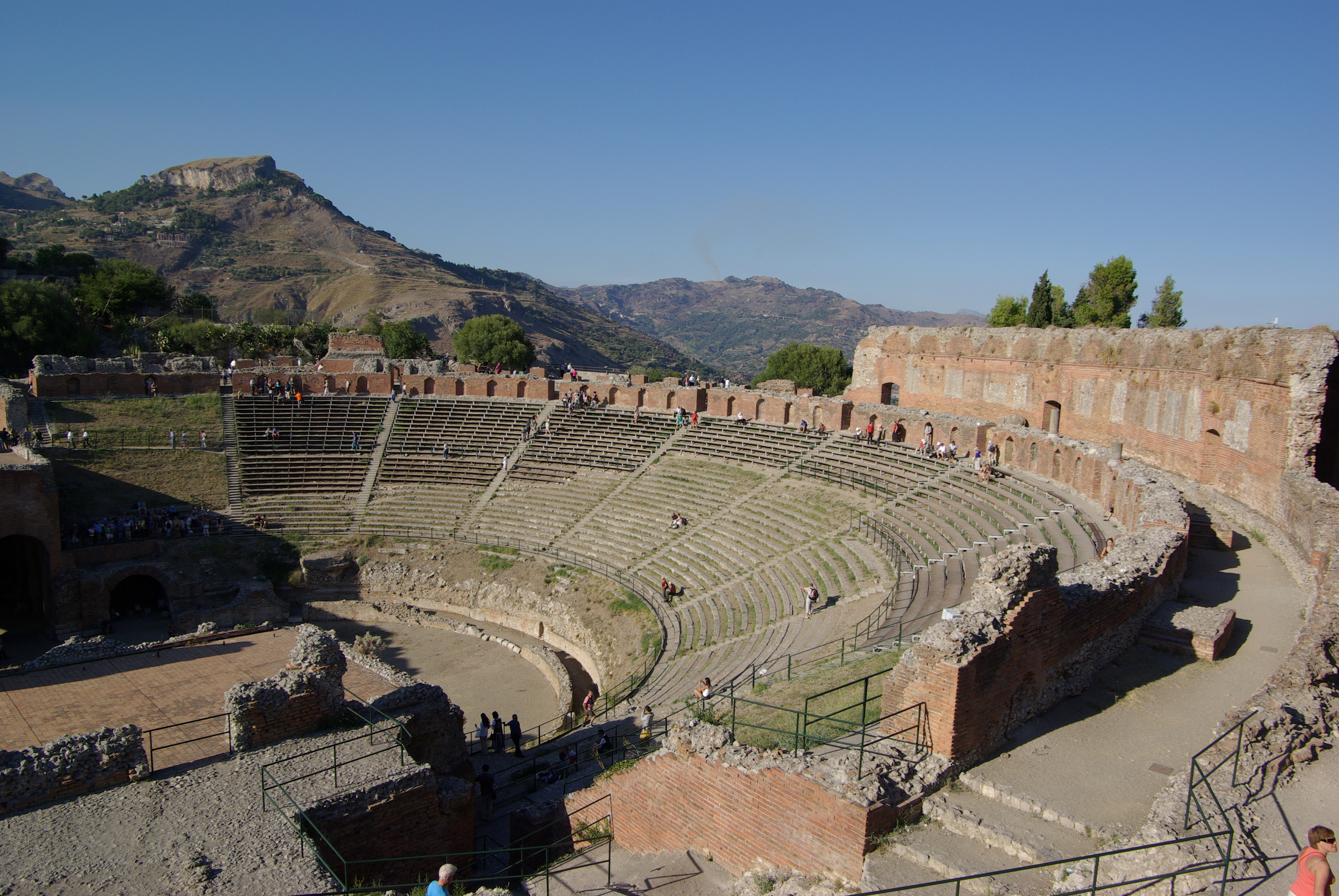
Greek Theater of Taormina, Sicily

The Sicilian Greek colonists in Magna Graecia, but also from Campania and Apulia, also brought theatrical art from their motherland. The Greek Theatre of Syracuse, the Greek Theatre of Segesta, the Greek Theatre of Tindari, the Greek Theatre of Hippana, the Greek Theatre of Akrai, the Greek Theatre of Monte Jato, the Greek Theatre of Morgantina and the most famous Greek Theater of Taormina, amply demonstrate this.

Only fragments of original dramaturgical works are left, but the tragedies of the three great giants Aeschylus, Sophocles and Euripides and the comedies of Aristophanes are known.

Some famous playwrights in the Greek language came directly from Magna Graecia. Others, such as Aeschylus and Epicharmus, worked for a long time in Sicily. Epicharmus can be considered Syracusan in all respects, having worked all his life with the tyrants of Syracuse. His comedy preceded that of the more famous Aristophanes by staging the gods for the first time in comedy. While Aeschylus, after a long stay in the Sicilian colonies, died in Sicily in the colony of Gela in 456 BC. Epicarmus and Phormis, both of 6th century BC, are the basis, for Aristotle, of the invention of the Greek comedy, as he says in his book on Poetics:

As for the composition of the stories (Epicharmus and Phormis) it came in the beginning from Sicily

— Aristotle, Poetics

Other native dramatic authors of Magna Graecia, in addition to the Syracusan Phormis mentioned, are Achaeus of Syracuse, Apollodorus of Gela, Philemon of Syracuse and his son Philemon the younger. From Calabria, precisely from the colony of Thurii, came the playwright Alexis. While Rhinthon, although Sicilian from Syracuse, worked almost exclusively for the colony of Taranto.

== Sport ==
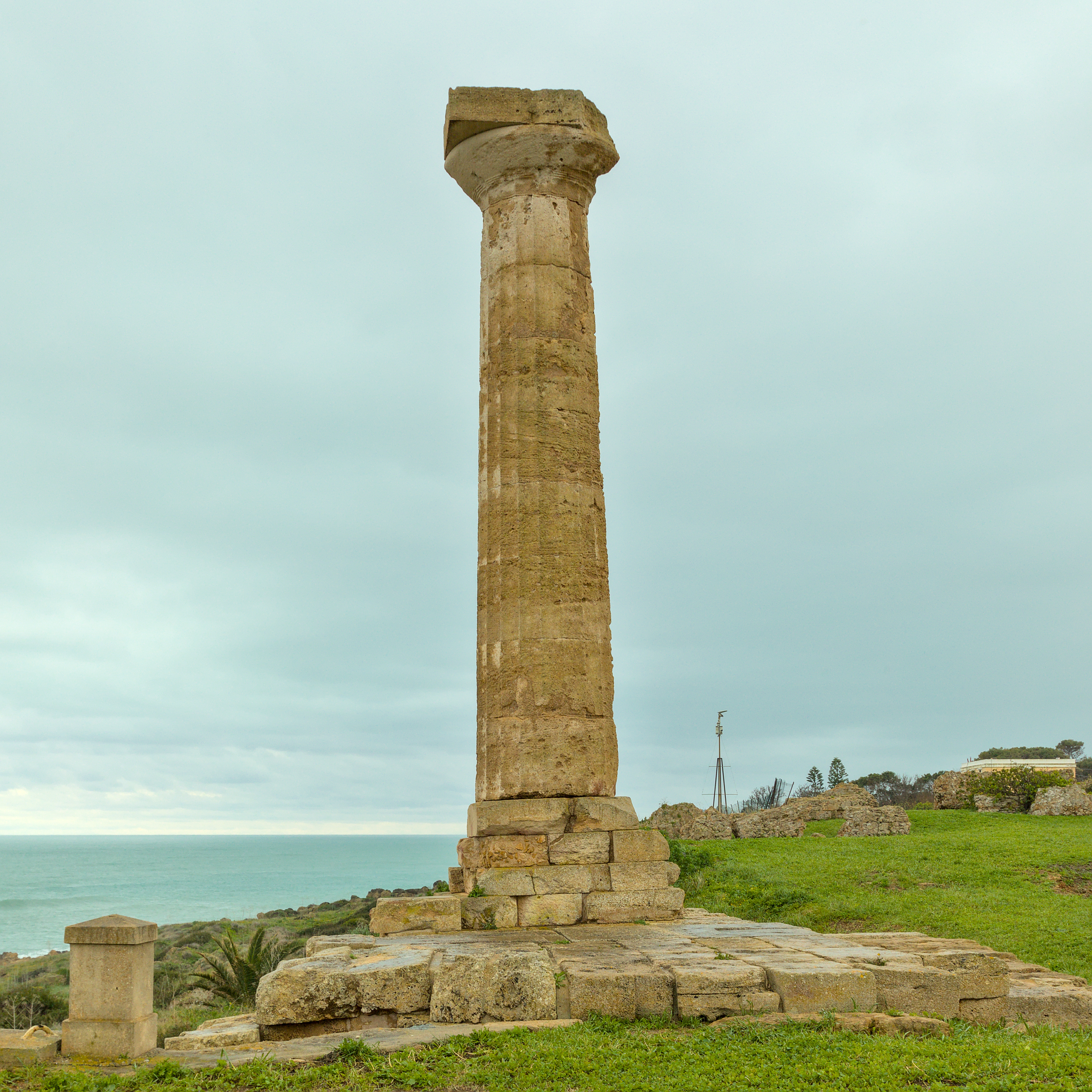
The ruins of the Temple of Juno Lacinia located on Capo Colonna, a building of the ancient Greek city of Kroton (now Crotone)

The colonies sent athletes of all disciplines to the Ancient Olympic Games which were periodically held at Olympia and Delphi in Greece.

The colonists of Magna Graecia were very fond of the Hellenic games in order to prove to the Greeks that they belonged to the same place of origin, their physical strength and skills in the games displayed by their ancestors generations earlier, and for this reason sovereigns demanded that teams who were to be trained were sent to Greece.

Sport was therefore a channel of communication with the Hellenic peninsula, a means by which the colonies of Magna Graecia showed themselves to the rest of the Hellenic world. The settlers of Magna Graecia had great success in sporting competitions in their homeland. Crotone's athletes won 18 titles in 25 Olympics.

== Essential timeline ==
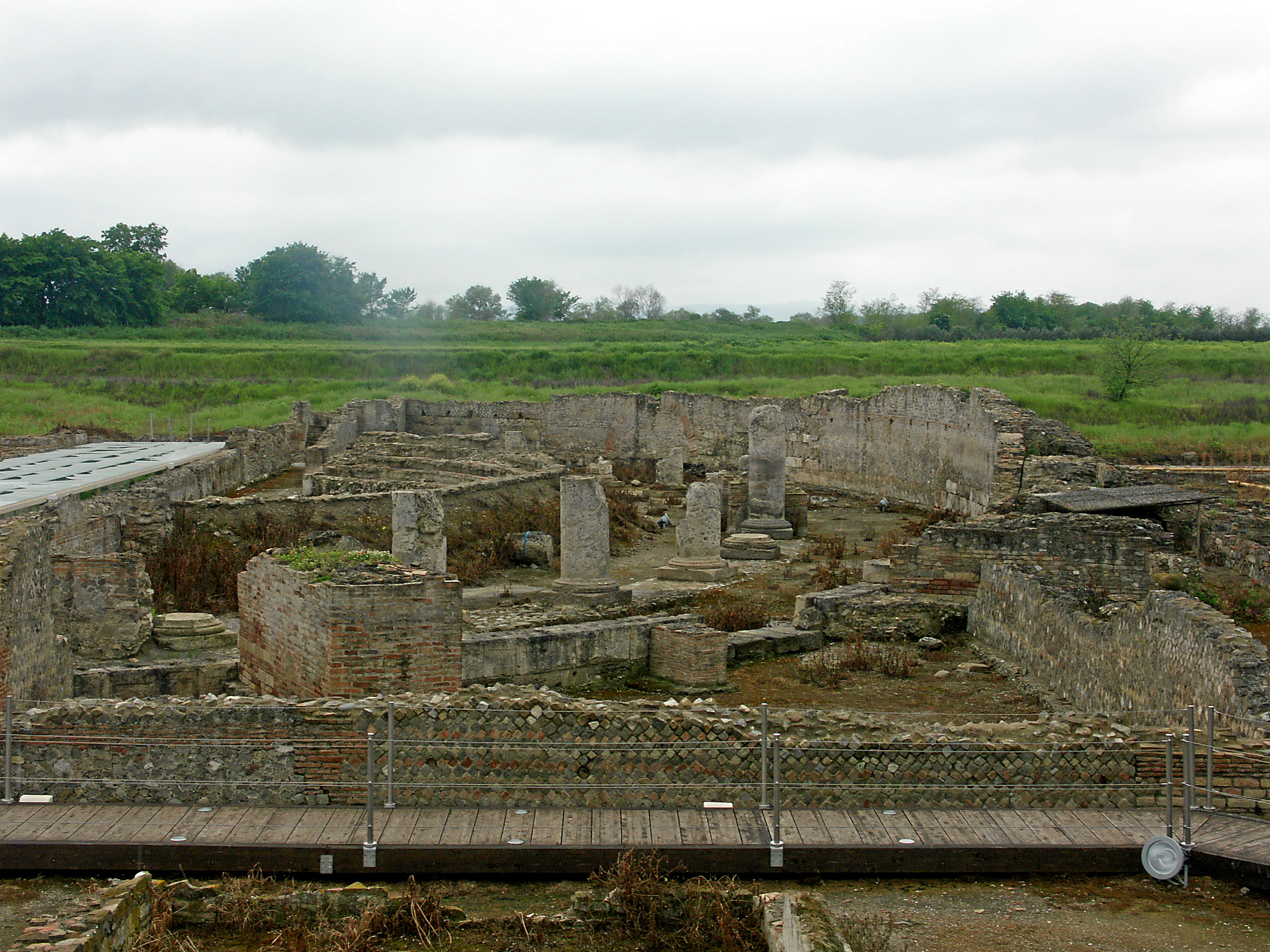
Remains of the ancient Greek city of Sybaris (now Sibari)

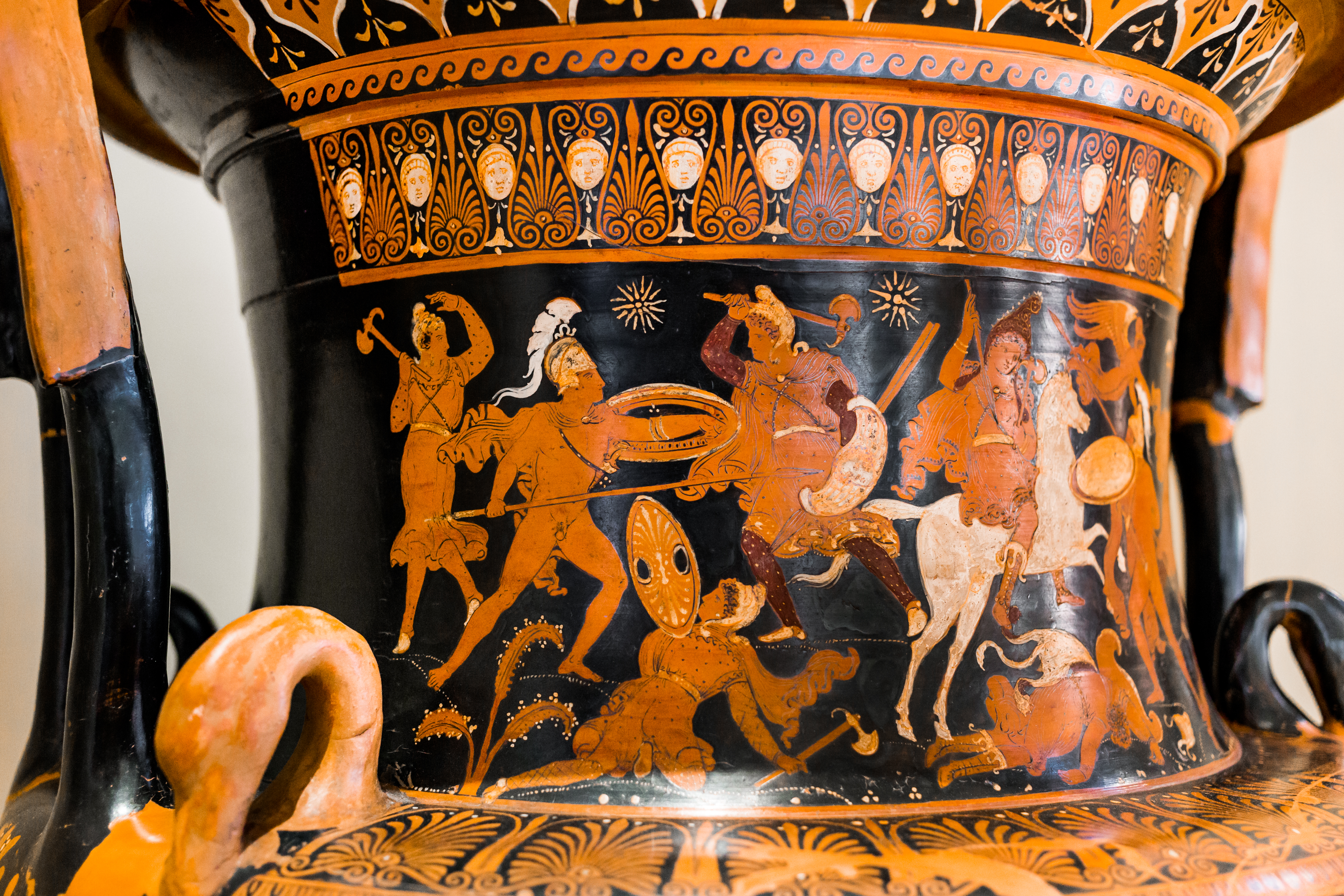
Combat scene between Greeks and Persians, on the neck of the Darius Vase, exhibited in the National Archaeological Museum of Naples, 340–320 BC

- 8th century BC: the first historical colony of Magna Graecia was that of Pithekoussai (current island of Ischia) founded in the 8th century BC by settlers from Chalcis and Eretria in Euboea. Probably, the island settlement of Pithekoussai was only a commercial establishment where the Greeks dealt with other peoples, especially with the Phoenician merchants, even if the issue is controversial.
- 720 BC: the first Greek colony in mainland Italy, Kyme, is founded.
- 7th–6th century BC: maximum splendor of Sibari.
- 6th century BC: maximum splendor of Crotone.
- 6th–3rd century BC: minting of coins by the cities of Magna Graecia.
- 6th–5th century BC: maximum splendour of Magna Graecia due to the Pythagorean reforms and institutions.
- 510 BC: Sibari was defeated by Crotone whose troops were commanded by the famous athlete Milo of Croton. The city of Sibari was destroyed and its population was condemned to exile.
- 5th century BC: maximum splendor of Syracuse.
- 480 BC: Gelon, tyrant of Syracuse, defeated the troops of Carthage at Himera, in the north of Sicily.
- 474 BC: The fleet led by Hiero I, tyrant of Syracuse, assisted Kyme threatened by the Etruscans. This victory marked the end of the Etruscan extension in Campania.
- 459–454 BC: after an internal civil war in Crotone, the cities of Magna Graecia once linked to it, dissolve the bond of subjection.
- 444–443 BC: foundation of Thourioi. An Athenian expedition, officially Panhellenic because it was made up of Greeks from the islands of the Aegean Sea, founded the city of Thourioi. In reality, the cities of the Aegean Sea were part of the Delian League, a military league under the rule of Athens. The city of Thourioi hosted important people such as Herodotus, Protagoras, Hippodamus of Miletus and Lysias.
- 415–413 BC: The Sicilian Expedition occurred. It was an Athenian military expedition to Sicily, which took place from 415 to 413 BC, during the Peloponnesian War, between Athens on one side and Sparta, Syracuse and Corinth on the other. The expedition ended in a devastating defeat for the Athenian forces, severely impacting Athens. After the first Athenian victories, which put the Syracusan army in serious difficulty, the tide of the war was turned upside-down due to the Spartan reinforcements under the command of Gylippus. The defeat of the Athenian army led to the imprisonment of its soldiers in the Syracusan latomies, where they were forced to live in hardship and suffering until their death; few were the survivors who managed to return to their homeland. The failure of the expedition marked the beginning of the military and political decline of Athens, followed by the aristocratic coup d'état of 411 BC; it also marked Athens' definitive defeat in the Peloponnesian War (404 BC). Thucydides, an Athenian historian, dedicates two books of his work History of the Peloponnesian War to the Athenian expedition, to underline the magnitude and exceptionality of the event. Thus he began "a new work, a work on Sicily" which became the background of the Peloponnesian War (431–404 BC). The Parallel Lives of Plutarch (in particular the Life of Nicias) and the Bibliotheca historica of Diodorus Siculus are other important sources on the expedition to Sicily.
- 400 BC: the cities of Magna Graecia overlooking the Tyrrhenian Sea begin to fall into the hands of the Italic peoples.
- 4th century BC: the cultural decline of the cities of Magna Graecia begins.
- 387 BC: Reggio is destroyed by Syracuse.
- 303 BC: peace between Taranto and Lucanians, who had attempted to conquer the city.
- 285 BC: Roman garrisons settle in Thourioi.
- 282–272 BC: Taranto was conquered by the Romans despite the intervention of Pyrrhus (Pyrrhic War in Italy).
- 264–241 BC: First Punic War, Rome takes control of Sicily, with the exception of Syracuse, which becomes Rome's ally.
- 215–205 BC: during the Second Punic War Syracuse and then Taranto sided with Carthage. The two cities were conquered by the Romans in 211 after a three-year siege. These events put an end to the independence of all the cities of Magna Graecia, which were annexed to the Roman Republic in 205 BC.

== Modern and contemporary Italy ==
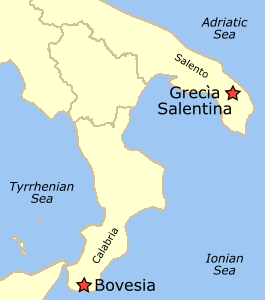
Map showing the areas where the Griko language is still spoken (Bovesia and Grecìa Salentina); the last living trace of the Greek elements that once formed Magna Graecia.

Greek nobles started taking refuge in Italy following the Fall of Constantinople in 1453. Greeks immigrated once again to the region in the 16th and 17th centuries in reaction to the conquest of the Peloponnese by the Ottoman Empire. Especially after the end of the Siege of Coron (1534), large numbers of Greeks took refuge in the areas of Calabria, Salento and Sicily. Greeks from Coroni, the so-called Coronians, were nobles, who brought with them substantial movable property.

Other Greeks who moved to Italy came from the Mani Peninsula of the Peloponnese. The Maniots (their name originating from the Greek word mania) were known for their proud military traditions and for their bloody vendettas, many of which continue today. Another group of Maniot Greeks moved to Corsica in the 17th century under the protection of the Republic of Genoa.

Although many of the Greek inhabitants of Magna Graecia were entirely Latinized during the Middle Ages, pockets of Greek culture and language remained and have survived to the present day. One example is the Griko people in Calabria (Bovesia) and Salento (Grecìa Salentina), some of whom still maintain their Greek language (Griko language) and customs. The Griko language is the last living trace of the Greek elements that once formed Magna Graecia. Their working practices have been passed down through generations through storytelling and allowing the observation of work. The Italian parliament recognizes the Griko people as an ethnolinguistic minority under the official name of Minoranze linguistiche Grike dell'Etnia Griko-Calabrese e Salentina.

Messina in Sicily is home to a small Greek-speaking minority, which arrived from the Peloponnese between 1533 and 1534 when fleeing the expansion of the Ottoman Empire. They were officially recognised in 2012.

== UNESCO World Heritage Sites related to Magna Graecia ==
=== Valle dei Templi ===
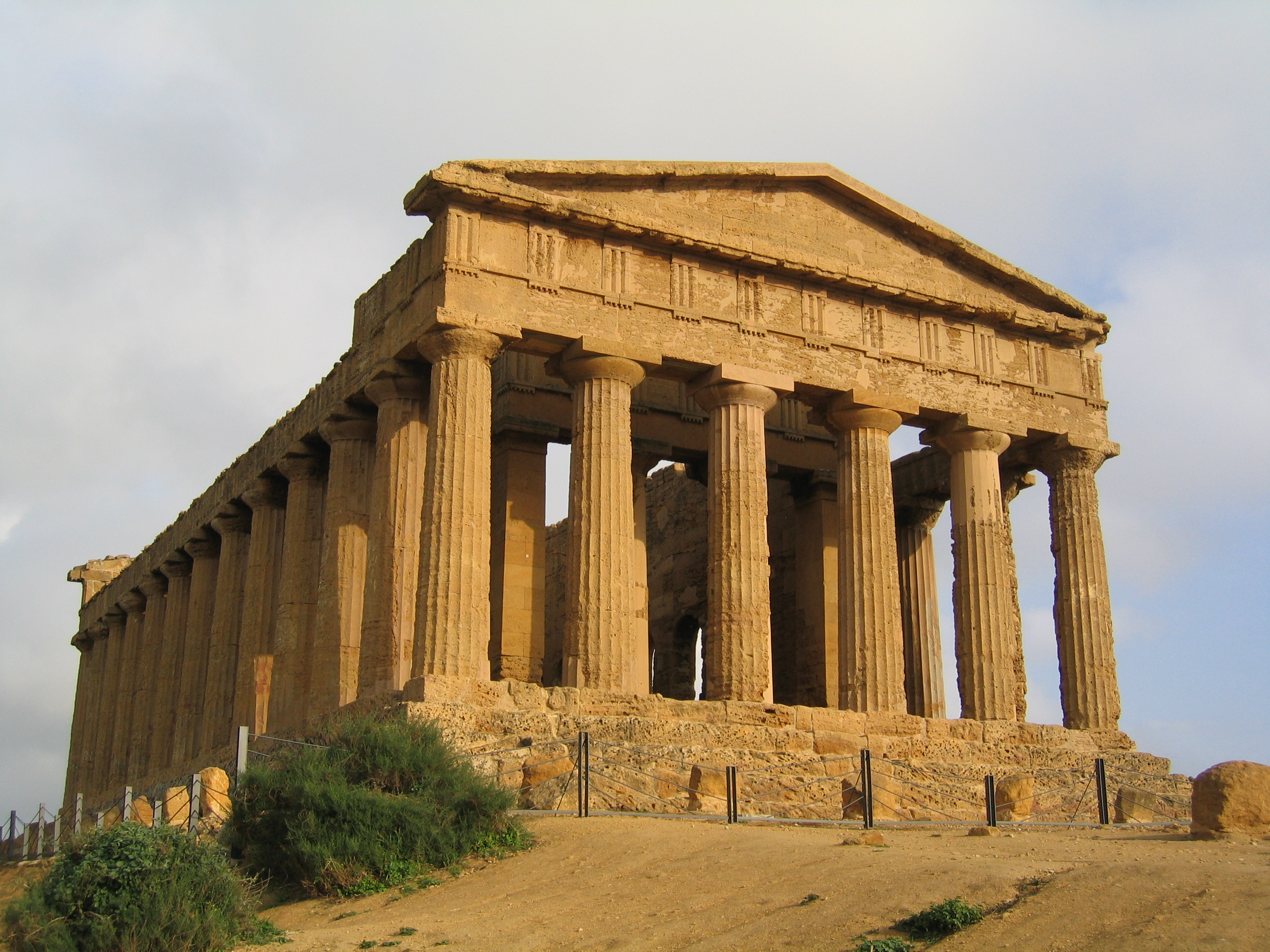
The Temple of Concordia, Valle dei Templi, Agrigento, Sicily

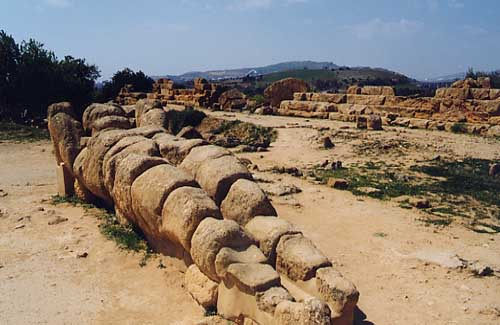
Remains of one atlas in the Olympeion field, Valle dei Templi, Agrigento, Sicily

The Valle dei Templi, or Valley of the Temples, is an archaeological site in Agrigento (ancient Greek Akragas), Sicily. It is one of the most outstanding examples of ancient Greek art and architecture of Magna Graecia. The term "valley" is a misnomer, the site is located on a ridge outside the town of Agrigento.

Since 1997, the entire area has been included in the UNESCO World Heritage List. The archaeological and landscape park of the Valle dei Templi, with its 1,300 hectares, is the largest archaeological park in Europe and the Mediterranean basin.

The Valley includes remains of seven temples, all in Doric style. The ascription of the names, apart from that of the Olympeion, is a mere tradition established in Renaissance times. The temples are:

- Temple of Concordia, whose name comes from a Latin inscription found nearby, and which was built in the 5th century BC. Turned into a church in the 6th century AD, it is now one of the best preserved in the Valley.
- Temple of Juno, also built in the 5th century BC. It was burnt in 406 BC by the Carthaginians.
- Temple of Heracles, who was one of the most venerated deities in the ancient Akragas. It is the most ancient in the Valley: destroyed by an earthquake, it consists today of only eight columns.
- Temple of Olympian Zeus, built in 480 BC to celebrate the city-state's victory over Carthage. It is characterized by the use of large-scale atlases.
- Temple of Castor and Pollux. Despite its remains including only four columns, it is now the symbol of modern Agrigento.
- Temple of Hephaestus (Vulcan), also dating from the 5th century BC. It is thought to have been one of the most imposing constructions in the valley; it is now however one of the most eroded.
- Temple of Asclepius, located far from the ancient town's walls; it was the goal of pilgrims seeking cures for illness.

The Valley is also home to the so-called Tomb of Theron, a large tuff monument of pyramidal shape; scholars suppose it was built to commemorate the Romans killed in the Second Punic War.

=== Poseidonia and Elea ===
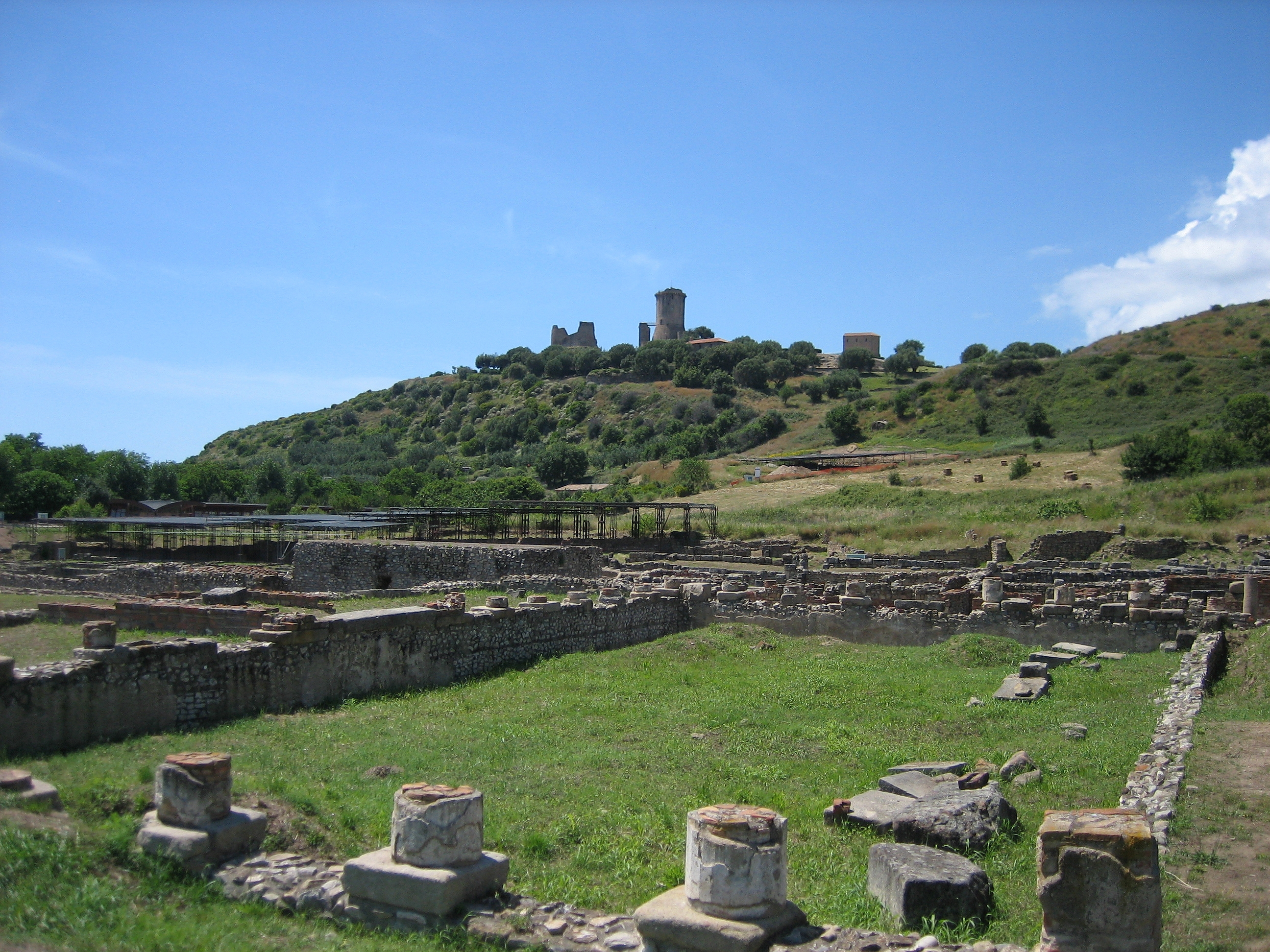
Remains of the ancient Greek city of Elea

Cilento, Vallo di Diano and Alburni National Park (Italian Parco Nazionale del Cilento, Vallo di Diano e Alburni) is an Italian national park in the Province of Salerno, in Campania in southern Italy. It includes much of the Cilento, the Vallo di Diano and the Monti Alburni. It was founded in 1991, and was formerly known as the Parco Nazionale del Cilento e Vallo di Diano. In 1998 it became a World Heritage Site of UNESCO, along with the ancient Greek towns of Poseidonia, Elea and the Padula (Note: Municipality not included in the park but part of Vallo di Diano region.) Charterhouse.

Much of the most celebrated features of the Poseidonia site today are the three large temples in the Archaic version of the Greek Doric order, dating from about 550 to 450 BC. All are typical of the period, (Note: Indeed, they very often are used to illustrate the style in architectural books.) with massive colonnades having a very pronounced entasis (widening as they go down), and very wide capitals resembling upturned mushrooms. Above the columns, only the second Temple of Hera retains most of its entablature, the other two having only the architrave in place. These were dedicated to Hera and Athena (Juno and Minerva to the Romans), although previously they often have been identified otherwise, following eighteenth-century arguments. The two temples of Hera are right next to each other, while the Temple of Athena is on the other side of the town centre. There were other temples, both Greek and Roman, which are far less well preserved.

Remains of Elea walls, with traces of one gate and several towers, of a total length of over three miles, still exist, and belong to three different periods, in all of which the crystalline limestone of the locality is used. Bricks were also employed in later times; their form is peculiar to this place, each having two rectangular channels on one side, and being about 1.5 inches square, with a thickness of nearly 4 inches They all bear Greek brick-stamps. There are some remains of cisterns on the site, and, various other traces of buildings.

=== Syracuse ===
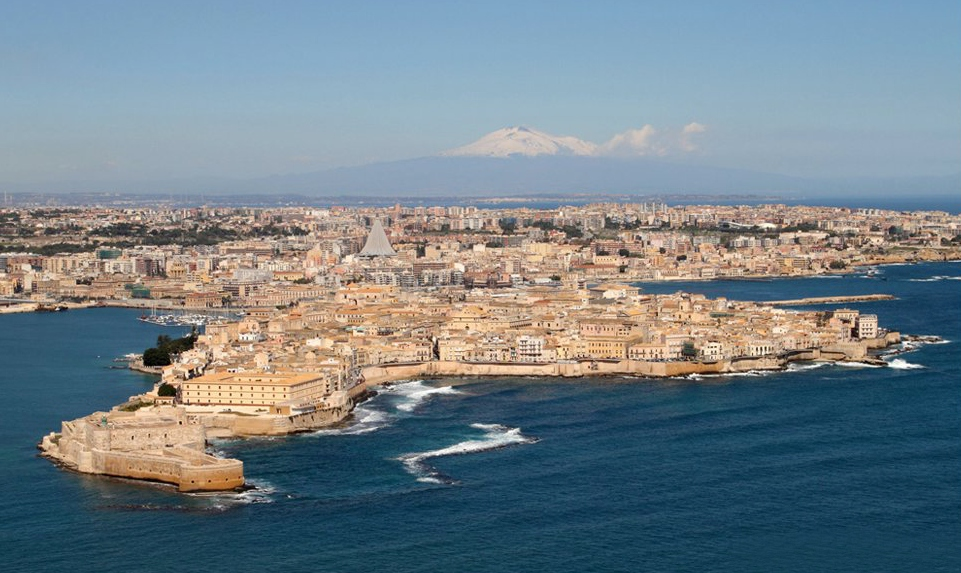
Ortygia island, where Syracuse was founded in ancient Greek times

Syracuse was founded in 733 BC by Greek settlers from Corinth and Tenea, led by the oecist (colonizer) Archias. There are many attested variants of the name of the city including Συράκουσαι Syrakousai, Συράκοσαι Syrakosai and Συρακώ Syrakō. In the modern day, the city is listed by UNESCO as a World Heritage Site along with the Necropolis of Pantalica.

The buildings of Syracuse from the Greek period are:

- The city walls
- The Temple of Apollo, at Piazza Emanuele Pancali, adapted to a church in Byzantine times and to a mosque under Arab rule.
- The Fountain of Arethusa, on Ortygia island. According to a legend, the nymph Arethusa, hunted by Alpheus, was turned into a spring by Artemis and appeared here.
- The Greek Theatre of Syracuse, whose cavea is one of the largest ever built by the ancient Greeks: it has 67 rows, divided into nine sections with eight aisles. Only traces of the scene and the orchestra remain. The edifice (still used today) was modified by the Romans, who adapted it to their different style of spectacles, including circus games. Near the theatre are the latomìe, stone quarries, also used as prisons in ancient times. The most famous latomìa is the Orecchio di Dionisio ("Ear of Dionysius").
- The Tomb of Archimede, in the Grotticelli Necropolis. Decorated with two Doric columns.
- The Temple of Olympian Zeus, about 3 kilometres (2 miles) outside the city, built around the 6th century BC.

== Archaeological sites related to Magna Graecia ==
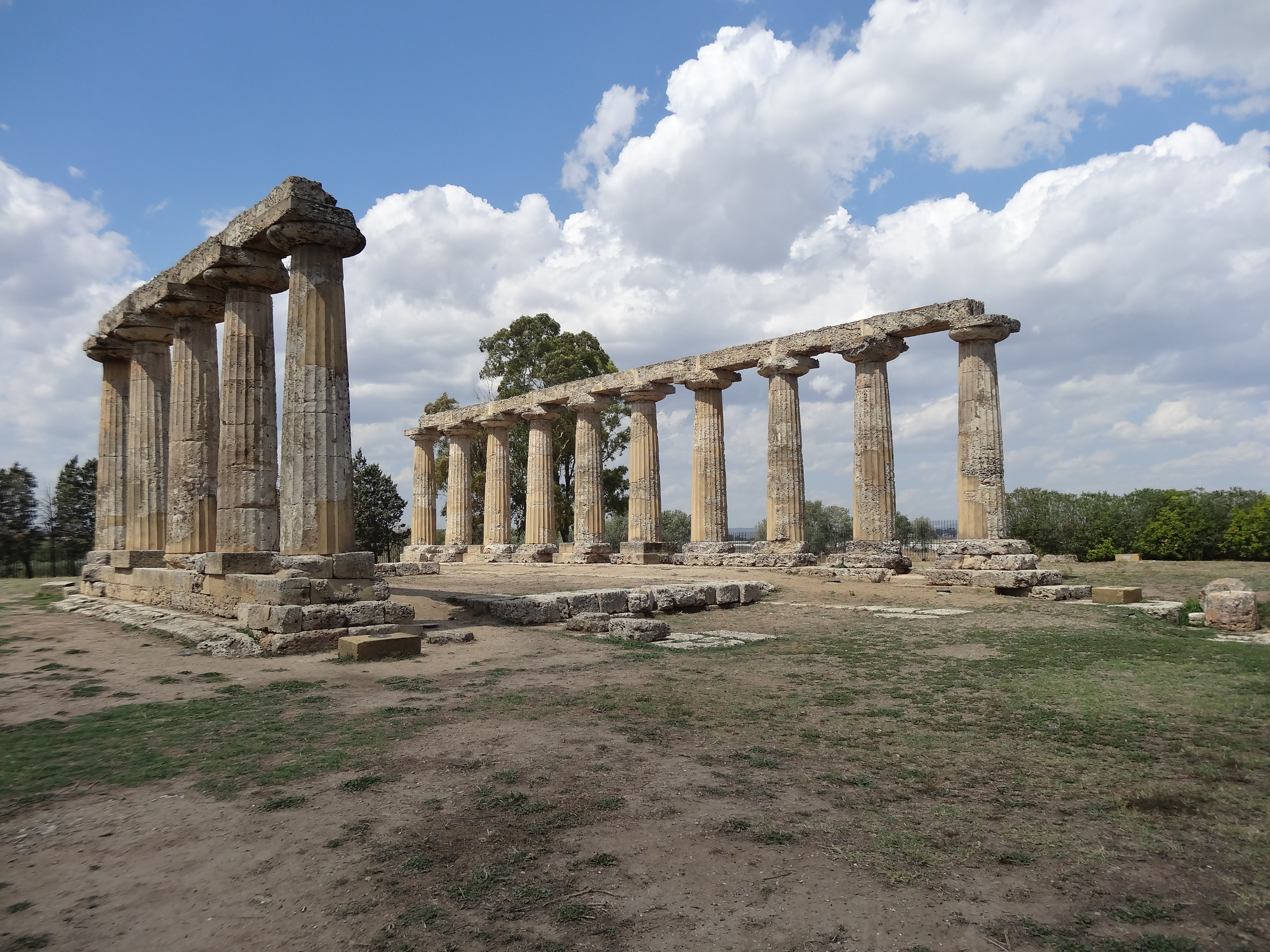
Tavole Palatine, the remains of a hexastyle peripteral Greek temple of the 6th century BC, dedicated to the goddess Hera and the god Apollo.

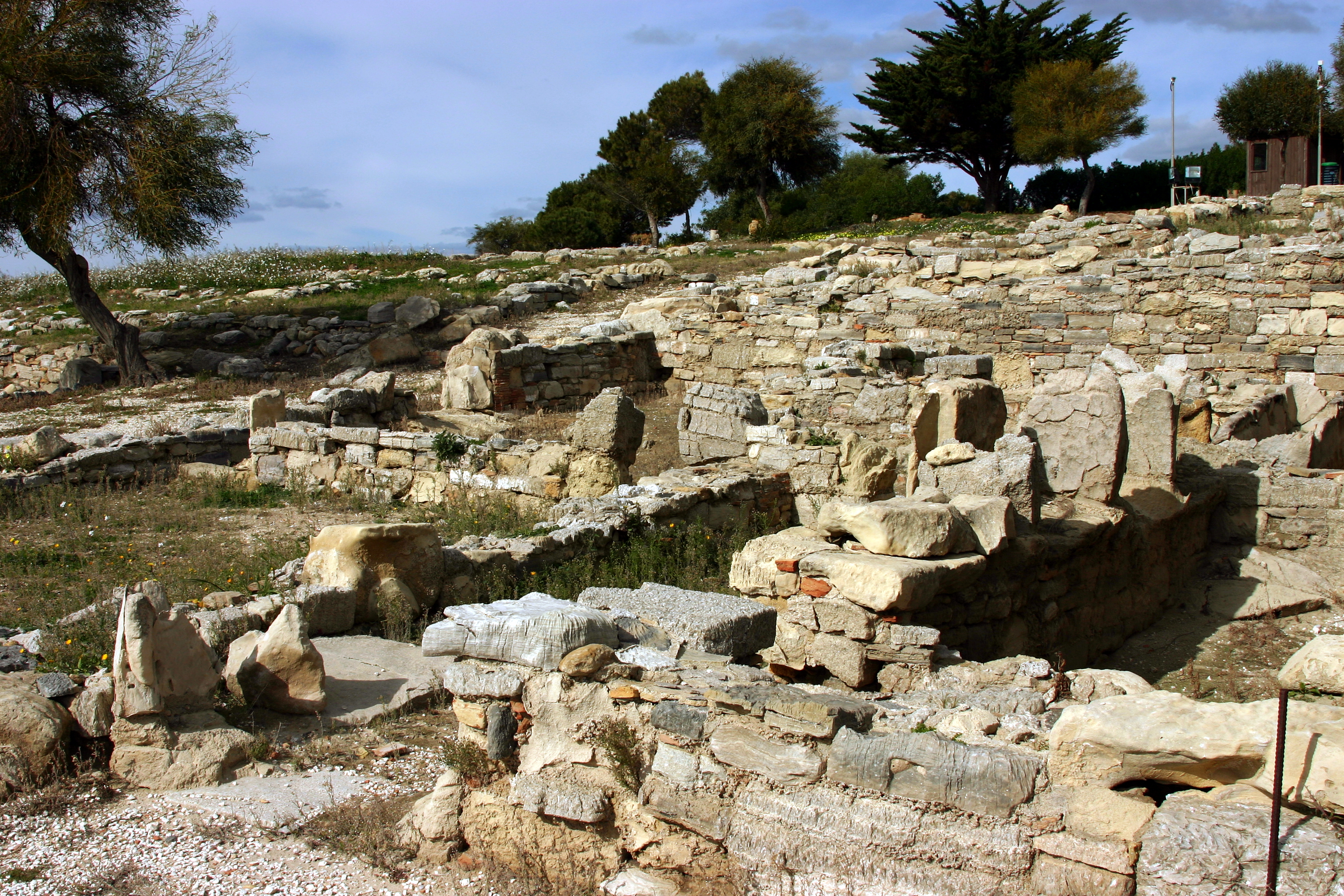
Remains of the ancient Greek city of Heraclea Minoa

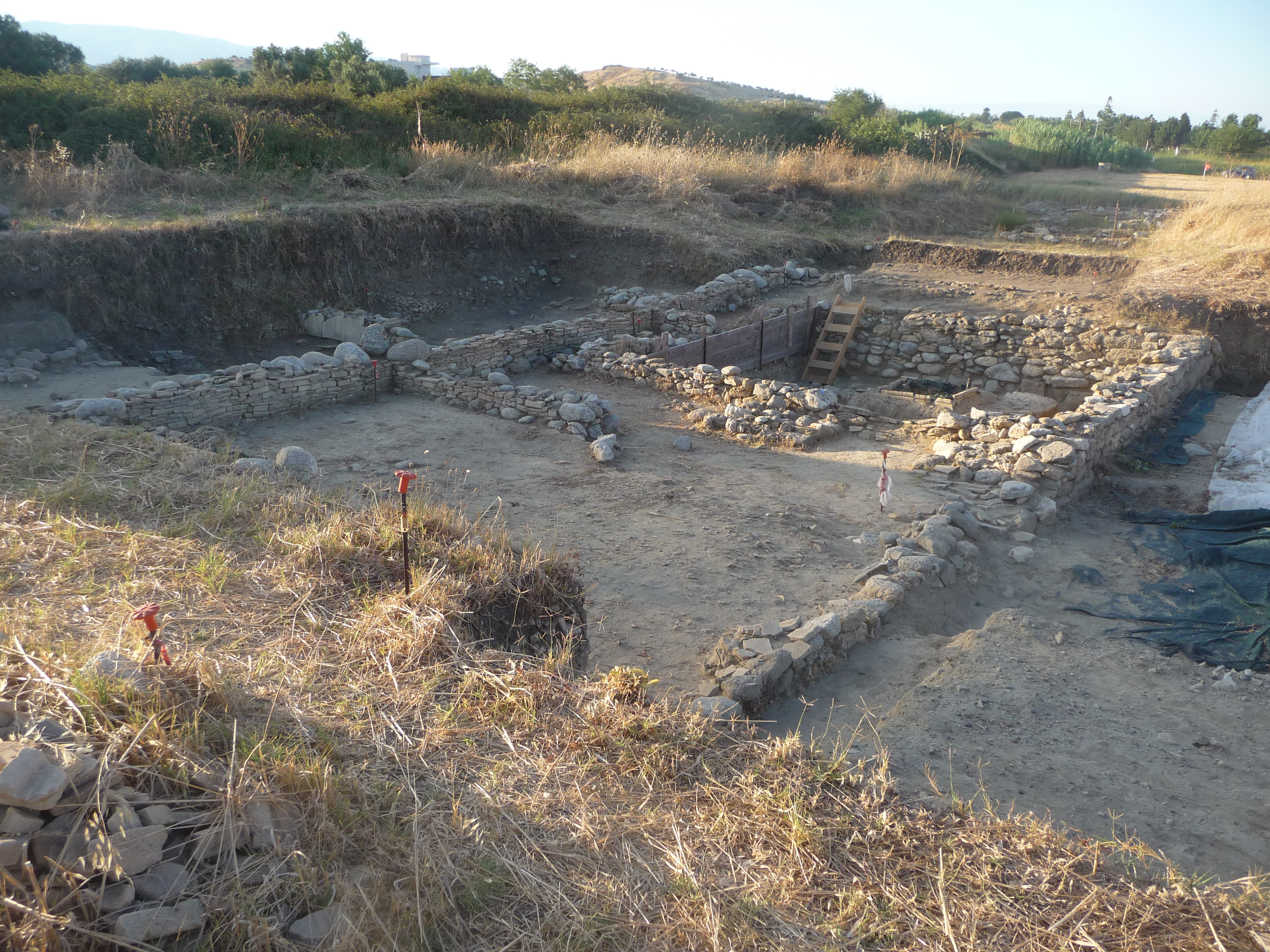
Remains of the ancient Greek city of Caulonia

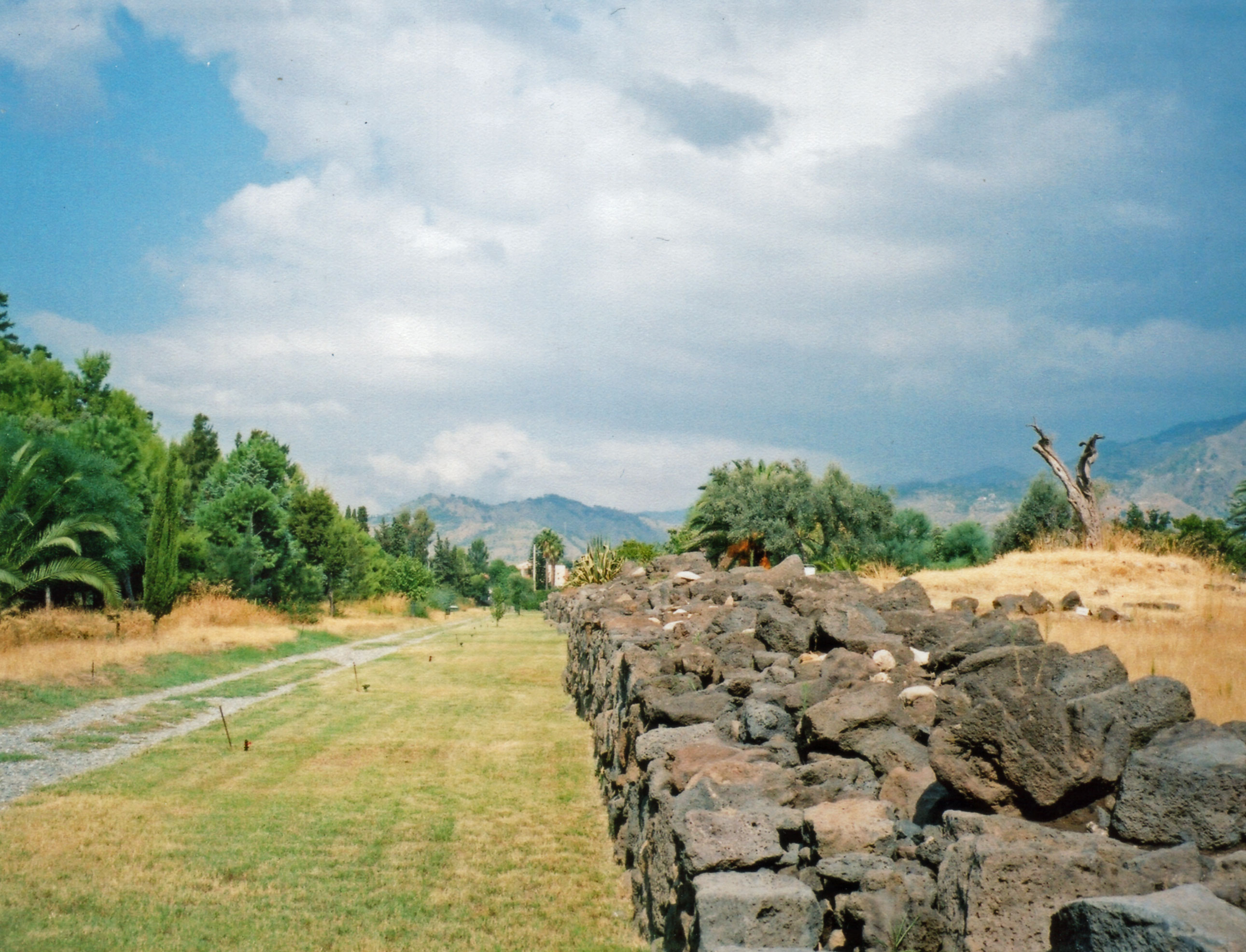
Remains of the ancient Greek city of Naxos

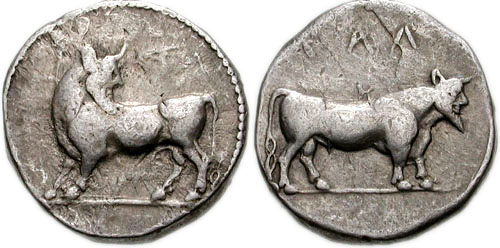
Stater of Laüs with man-headed bull, c. 490–470 BC

=== Apulia ===
- Rudiae
- Siponto

=== Basilicata ===
- Heraclea Lucania
- Metapontum
- Tavole Palatine

=== Calabria ===
- Caulonia
- Krimisa
- Laüs
- Skylletion
- Sybaris
- Terina
- Thurii
- Timpone della Motta

=== Campania ===
- Cumae
- Elea
- Heraion at Foce del Sele
- Poseidonia

=== Sicily ===
- Abacaenum
- Adranon
- Aetna
- Akrai
- Akrillai
- Apollonia
- Casmenae
- Eryx
- Halaesa
- Helorus
- Heraclea Minoa
- Herbessos
- Himera
- Hybla Gereatis
- Maktorion
- Megara Hyblaea
- Monte Adranone
- Morgantina
- Motya
- Naxos
- Segesta
- Selinunte
- Tindari
- Valle dei Templi

== See also ==
- Ancient Greek dialects
- Greek coinage of Italy and Sicily
- Greek colonisation
- Greek diaspora
- Greeks in Italy
- Italiotes
- Graia
- Graïke
- Graecus
- Griko people
- Griko language
- Hellenic civilization
- Names of the Greeks

== Sources ==
- Polyxeni Adam-Veleni and Dimitra Tsangari (editors), Greek colonisation: New data, current approaches; Proceedings of the scientific meeting held in Thessaloniki (6 February 2015), Athens, Alpha Bank, 2015.
- Antonaccio, Carla M. (2007). "Colonization: Greece on the Move 900–480". In Shapiro, H.A. (ed.). The Cambridge Companion to Archaic Greece. Cambridge: Cambridge University Press.
- Benigno, Francesco; Giarrizzo, Giuseppe (1999a). Storia della Sicilia. Vol. 1. Roma-Bari: Laterza Editore. ISBN 88-421-0533-3.
- Michael J. Bennett, Aaron J. Paul, Mario Iozzo, & Bruce M. White, Magna Graecia: Greek Art From South Italy and Sicily, Cleveland, OH, Cleveland Museum of Art, 2002.
- John Boardman, N. G. L. Hammond (editors), The Cambridge Ancient History, vol. III, part 3, The Expansion of the Greek World, Eighth to Sixth Centuries B.C., Cambridge University Press, 1982.
- Boardman, John; Hammond, N.G.L. (1982). "Preface". In Boardman, John; Hammond, N.G.L (eds.). The Cambridge Ancient History. Vol. III.iii (2 ed.). Cambridge: Cambridge University Press.
- Giovanni Casadio & Patricia A. Johnston, Mystic Cults in Magna Graecia, Austin, University of Texas Press, 2009.
- Lucia Cerchiai, Lorenna Jannelli, & Fausto Longo (editors), The Greek cities of Magna Graecia and Sicily, Photography by Mark E. Smith, Los Angeles, J. Paul Getty Museum, 2004.ISBN 0-89236-751-2
- Giovanna Ceserani, Italy's Lost Greece: Magna Graecia and the Making of Modern Archaeology, New York, Oxford University Press, 2012.
- T. J. Dunbabin, The Western Greeks, 1948.
- Finley, Moses Israel (2009) [1970]. Storia della Sicilia antica (8 ed.). Roma-Bari: Editori Laterza. ISBN 978-88-420-2532-0.
- M. Gualtieri, Fourth Century B.C. Magna Graecia: A Case Study, Jonsered, Sweden, P. Åströms, 1993.
- Mogens Herman Hansen & Thomas Heine Nielsen, An Inventory of Archaic and Classical Poleis, Oxford University Press, 2004.
- R. Ross Holloway, Art and Coinage in Magna Graecia, Bellinzona, Edizioni arte e moneta, 1978.
- Margaret Ellen Mayo, The Art of South Italy: Vases From Magna Graecia, Richmond, Virginia Museum of Fine Arts, 1982.
- Giovanni Pugliese Carratelli, The Greek World: Art and Civilization in Magna Graecia and Sicily, New York: Rizzoli, 1996.
- ———— (editor), The Western Greeks: Catalog of an exhibition held in the Palazzo Grassi, Venice, March–Dec., 1996, Milan, Bompiani, 1976.
- William Smith, "Magna Graecia." In Dictionary of Greek and Roman Geography, 1854.
- A. G. Woodhead, The Greeks in the West, 1962.
- Günther Zuntz, Persephone: Three Essays on Religion and Thought in Magna Graecia, Oxford, Clarendon Press, 1971.
