= Kardaki Temple =

Archaic temple in Corfu, Greece

Coordinates: 39°36′05″N 19°55′34″E

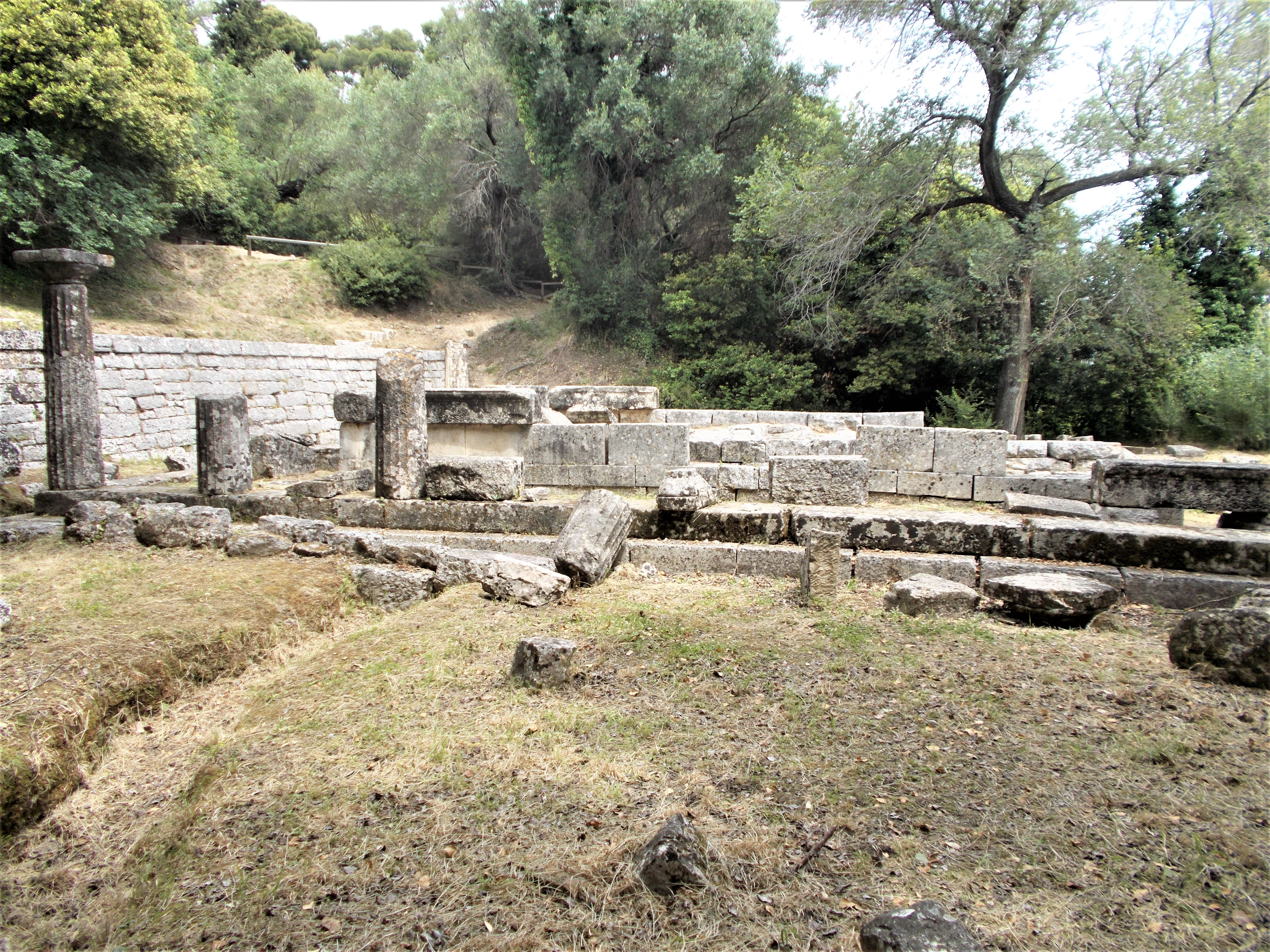
Kardaki Temple in Corfu

Kardaki Temple is an Archaic Doric temple in Corfu, Greece, built around 500 BC in the ancient city of Korkyra (or Corcyra), in what is known today as the location Kardaki in the hill of Analipsi in Corfu. The temple features several architectural peculiarities that point to a Doric origin. The temple at Kardaki is unusual because it has no frieze, following perhaps architectural tendencies of Sicilian temples. It is considered to be the only Greek temple of Doric architecture that does not have a frieze. The spacing of the temple columns has been described as "abnormally wide". The temple also lacked both porch and adyton, and the lack of a triglyph and metope frieze may be indicative of Ionian influence. The temple at Kardaki is considered an important and to a certain degree mysterious topic on the subject of early ancient Greek architecture. Its association with the worship of Apollo or Poseidon has not been established.

== Location ==
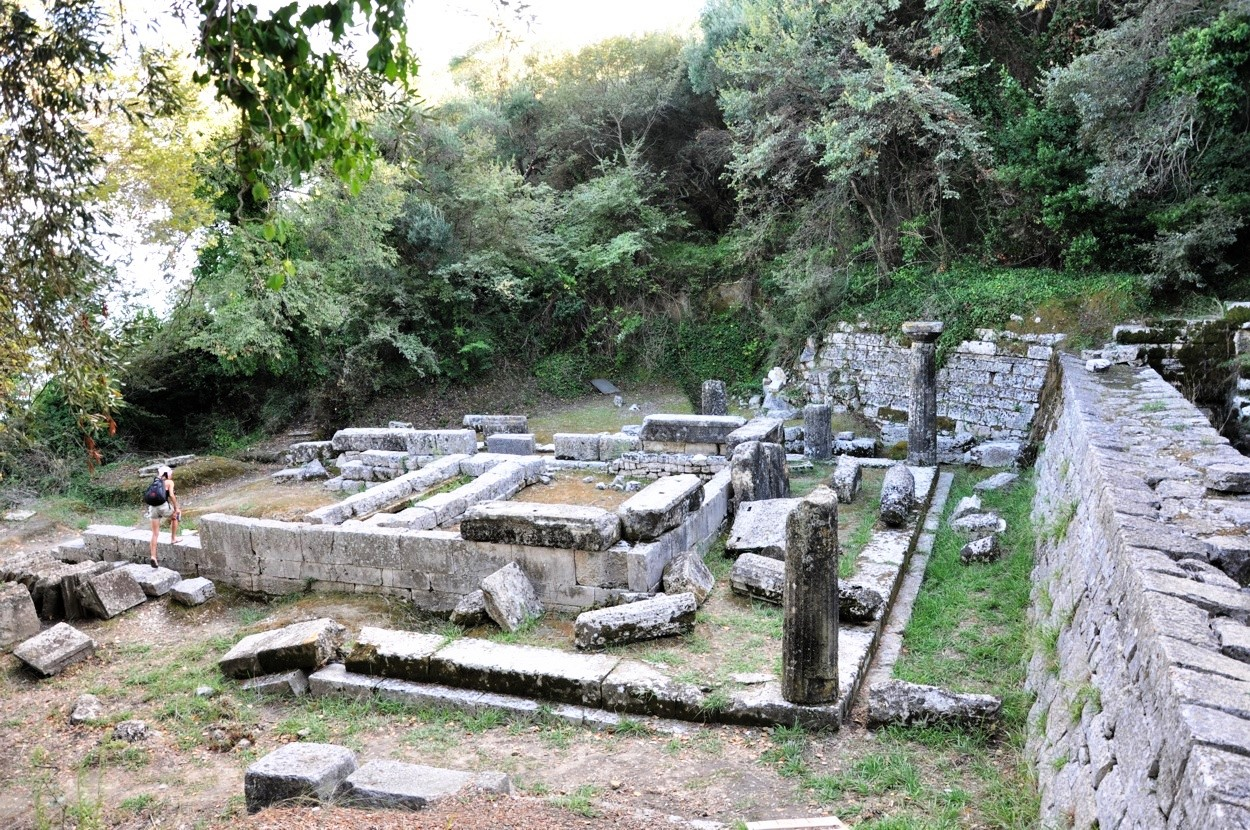
Kardaki Temple

The temple lies on the grounds of Mon Repos, a former residence of the Greek royal family built on the site of Palaiopolis, the original site of ancient Korkyra. The temple lies close to and to the southeast of the Temple of Hera (Heraion), which in turn is approximately 700 m. to the southeast of the Temple of Artemis. The site is known as Kardaki, or "Cada[c]chio" in Italian.

== Discovery ==
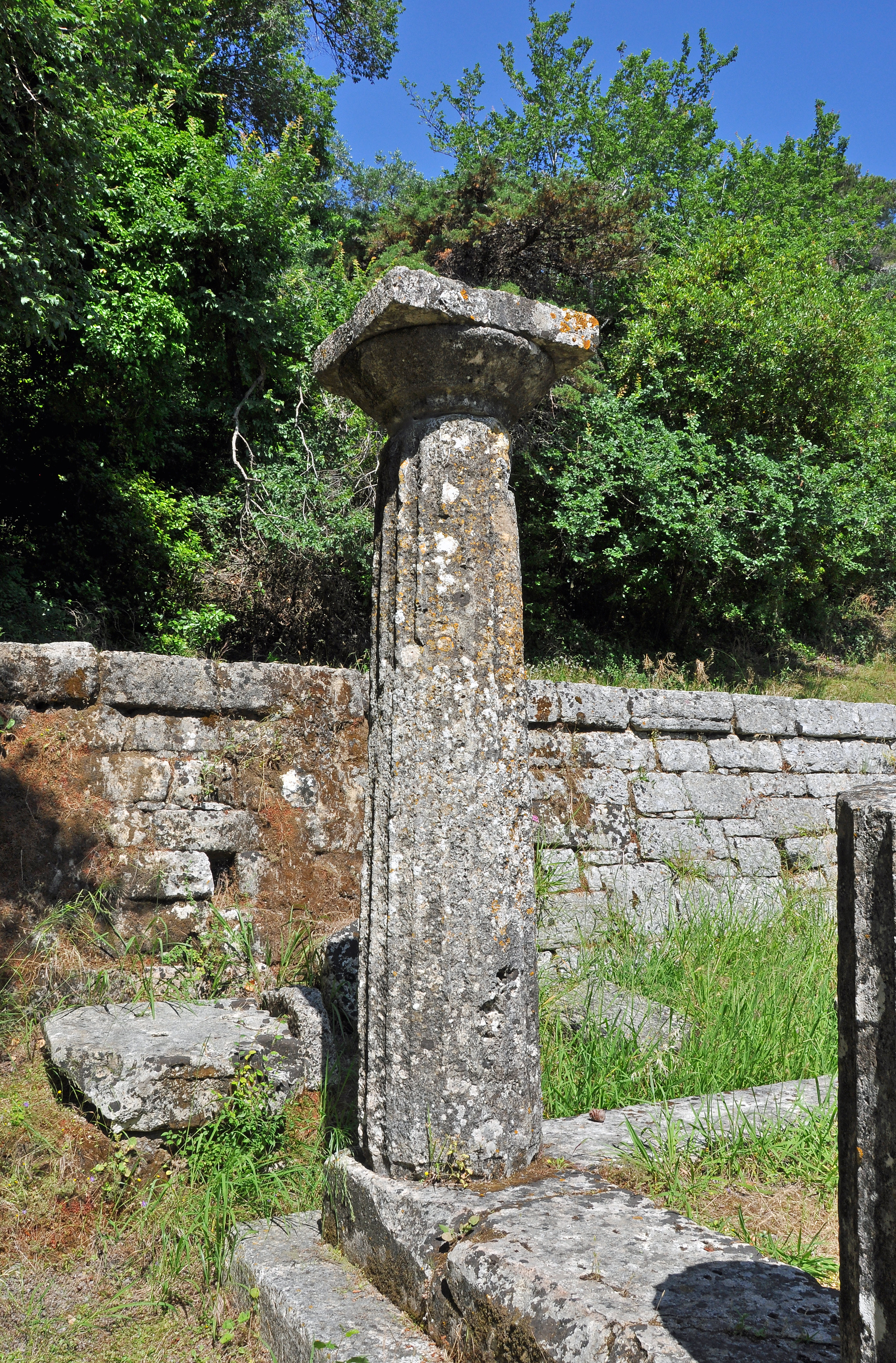
A column at the Kardaki Temple

The temple was discovered accidentally in 1822, during the British protectorate, by British engineers performing excavations to free the flow of the natural water emanating from the spring at Kardaki; the British navy depended on the water of the spring for its supplies, and, at the time, the flow of water was impeded by soil accumulation around the spring. As the engineers were removing the soil, they discovered a Doric column lying on the ground. The engineers then unearthed the rest of the temple, and they also discovered pottery in the shape of female heads and a leg. These terracota artefacts are thought to be either votive offerings or toys left at the tomb of a child. Following its discovery, the temple disappeared from view again, after a landslide from Analipsi hill covered it with soil.

In 1825, it was excavated again, and William Railton documented the site and published the results in his paper Antiquities of Athens and other Places in Greece, Sicily etc. Railton's work was published in a later edition of a famous work by Stuart and Revett. In 1830, Railton also illustrated a book titled The Newly Discovered Temple of Cadachio, in the Island of Corfu. The eastern boundary of the temple has collapsed and slid into the surrounding sea and has been underwater for a long time.

The temple at Kardaki, is considered an important and to a certain degree mysterious topic on the subject of early ancient Greek architecture.

== Early studies ==
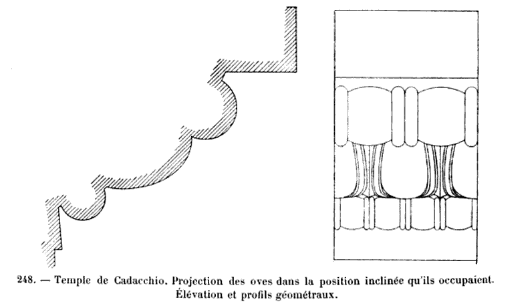
Kardaki Temple column capital geometric profile and elevation detail: Projection of the capital oval from the inclined position it occupied onto a plane parallel to the longitudinal column axis.

For over 80 years after Railton's study there were no further archaeological examinations of the temple. In 1909, the site was visited by the archaeologist William Bell Dinsmoor, who subsequently published his findings in a brief paper. In 1912–1914, German archaeologist Wilhelm Dörpfeld obtained permission from the King of Greece to excavate the area of the temple. Dörpfeld published his results in two brief notes without illustrations in the Archäologischer Anzeiger. Franklin P. Johnson expanded on Dörpfeld's findings by adding pictures and further details, which he published in 1936 in his paper "The Kardaki Temple" with the aim "that this unique structure may be better known and to make some suggestions toward determining its proper place in the field of Greek architecture."

== Architecture ==
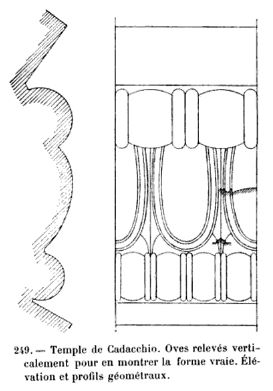
Kardaki Temple column capital geometric profile and elevation detail: Projection of the capital oval onto a plane perpendicular to the oval's radius of curvature, showing its true extent.

According to Johnson, the architect of the temple followed the architectural traditions of Corfu and Corinth. Johnson also writes that, by omitting the frieze, the architect consciously diverged from established norms, and by doing so he showed his considerable talent. The absence of a frieze results in a lighter entablature which enables the number of supporting columns to be reduced, thus the spacing of the columns is increased. It is considered to be the only Greek temple of Doric architecture that does not have a frieze. The spacing of the temple columns has been described as "abnormally wide". The dimensions of the temple are 11.91m by 25.5m with 6 columns by 12 columns respectively. Its association with the worship of Apollo or Poseidon has not been established.

The cella did not include either a porch or an adyton and the lack of a frieze may be indicative of Ionian influence. The porch may also have disappeared due to a landslide. Many of the tiles on the roof of the temple bore inscriptions of names, likely of chief magistrates who were contemporary to its construction or renovation periods. The names on the tiles included: Aristomenes, Thersia, and Damon. The temple's architectural style is hexastyle-peripteral. The period of the temple is estimated between 500 B.C. to the middle of the fifth century B.C. Kardaki Temple is the only archaic temple in Greece known to lack an epinaos, an omission similarly observed elsewhere in two temples at Selinus and Assos.

== Inscription ==
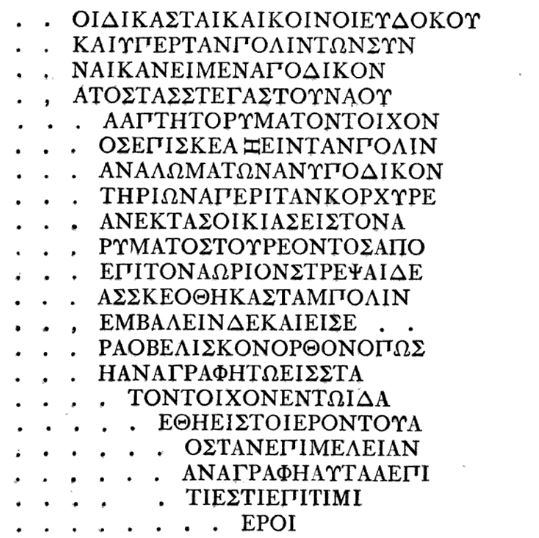
Kardaki Temple inscription

An inscription exists at a museum in Verona which appears to refer to the Kardaki Temple. The inscription, in Doric Greek, details works undertaken by the state of Korkyra (ancient Corfu) for the maintenance and repair of the Temple. It also accounts for the costs of the works and the prices of materials such as tin, lead and brass and the costs of transportation, labour, and excavation. Other costs included the acquisition of a brazen serpent, the construction and erection of an obelisk, and the construction of a retaining wall by a craftsman called Metrodorus.

The inscription provides the official approval of the magistrates of the Corcyrean republic for carrying out these works. The inscription also mentions that the roof of the temple was removed and states that the water channels have to be diverted so that they do not damage the retaining wall. From these writings, it is shown that the location of the temple near a sacred site of a natural spring was also the cause of constant problems with water damage and continuing repair. In the inscription there is also mention of nitre, which has been interpreted as meaning natron. Colonel Whitmore, the discoverer of the temple, had commented that he had noticed traces of a substance on the altar that resembled soda.

== Gallery ==
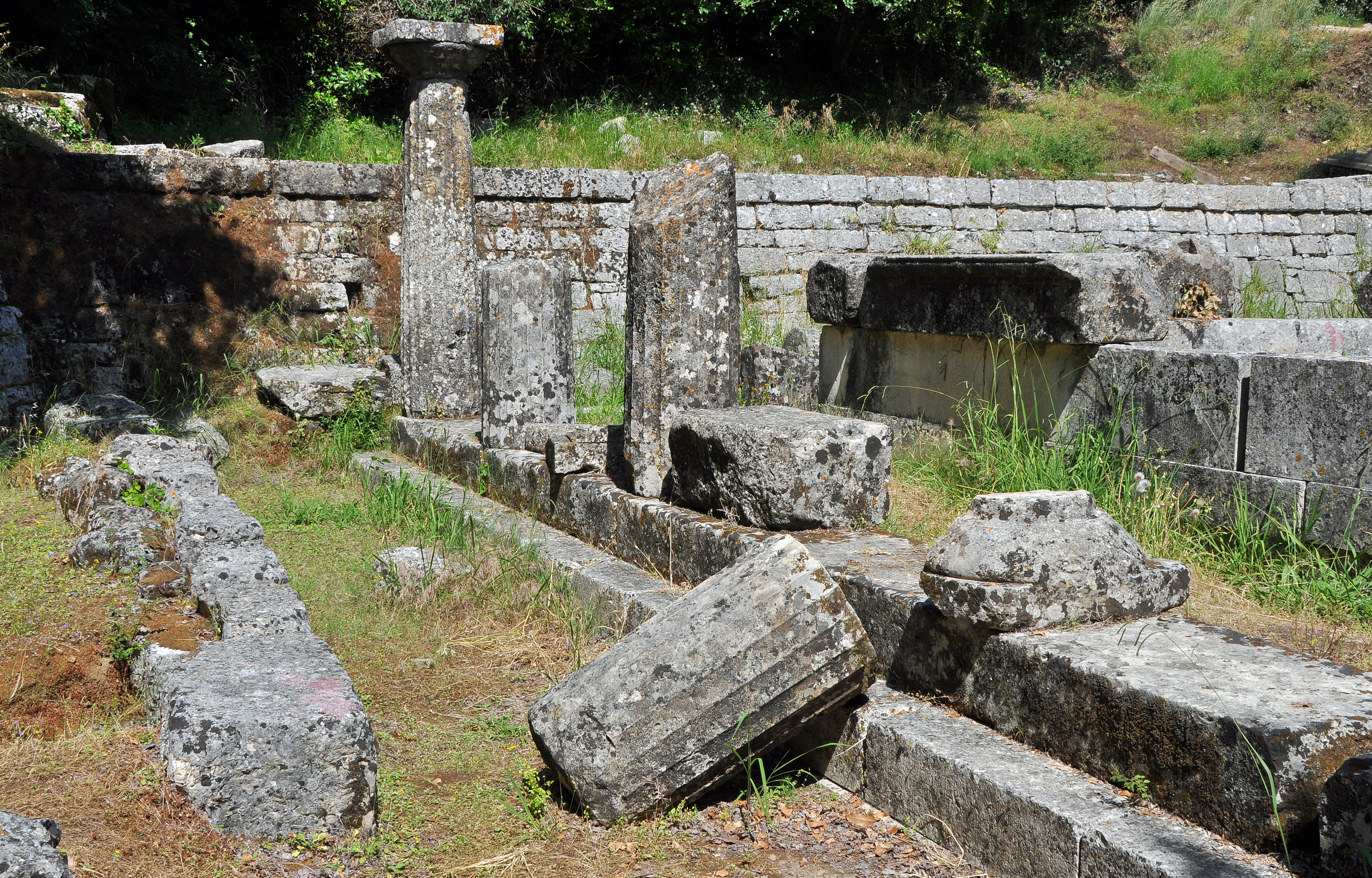
Close-up view of Kardaki Temple

== See also ==
- List of Ancient Greek temples
