= Temple of Artemis, Corfu =

Archaic temple in Corfu, Greece

Coordinates: 39°36′26″N 19°55′6″E

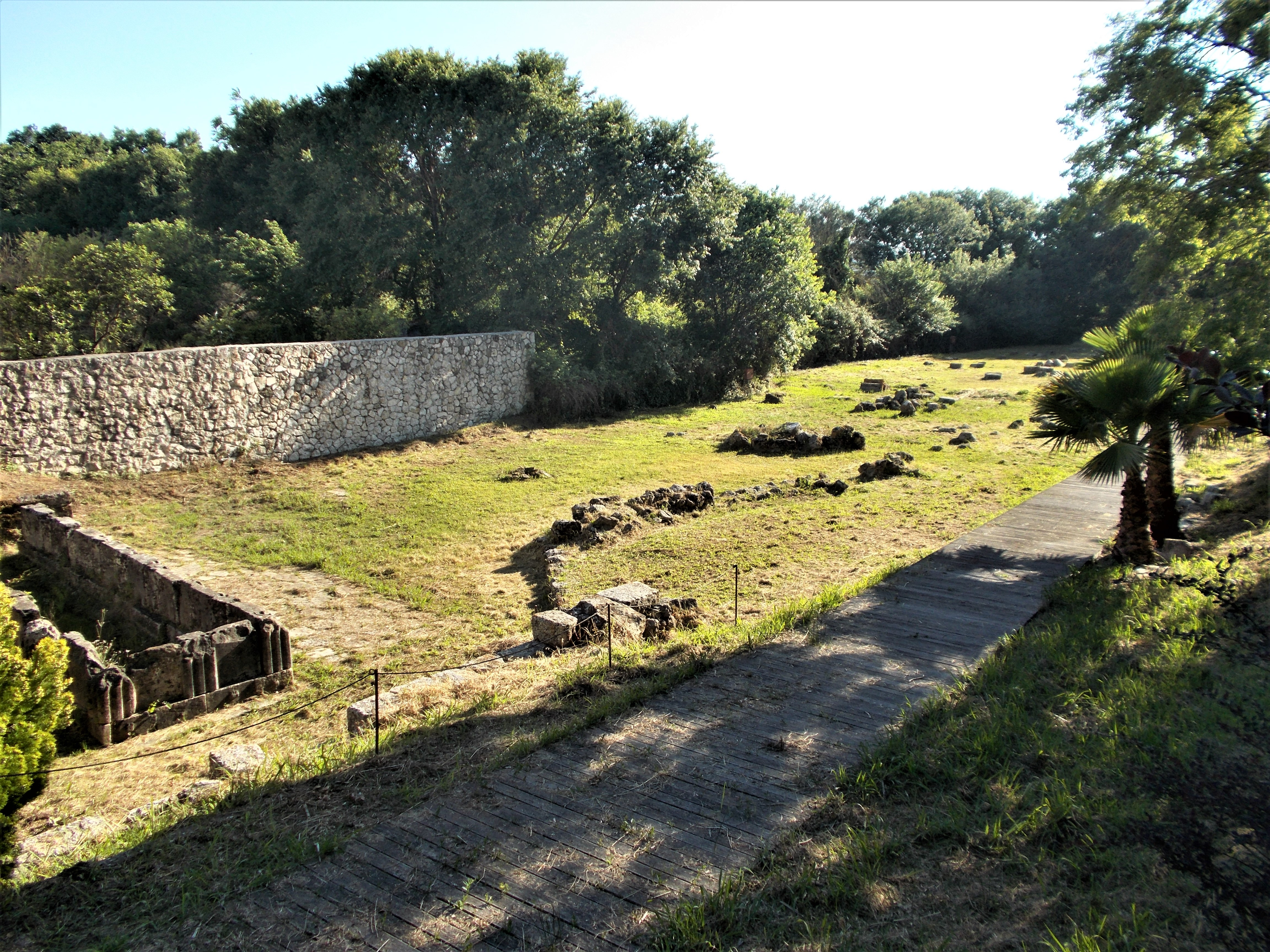
Ruins of the sanctuary of Artemis, including the altar on the left of the picture. The massive altar is precisely rectangular and stood in front of the temple. The temple was to the west (right) of the altar. The altar was 2.7 m wide and 25 m long. Only 8 m of its northern section survive. The Saint Theodore monastery was built on top of the southern portion of the altar.

The Temple of Artemis is an Archaic Greek temple in Corfu, Greece, built in around 580 BC in the ancient city of Korkyra (or Corcyra), now called Corfu. It is found on the property of the Saint Theodore monastery, which is located in the suburb of Garitsa. The temple was dedicated to Artemis. It is known as one of the first Doric temples built exclusively of stone. It is also considered one of the first buildings to have incorporated all the elements of the Doric architectural style. Sharing these historical records with the Temple of Apollo in Syracuse in Sicily (Italy). Very few Greek temple reliefs from the Archaic period have survived, and the large fragments of the group from the pediment are the earliest significant survivals. It was excavated from 1911 onwards.

The temple was a peripteral–styled building with a pseudodipteral configuration. Its perimeter was rectangular, with width of 23.46 m (77.0 ft) and length 49 m (161 ft) with an eastward orientation so that light could enter the interior of the temple at sunrise. It was one of the largest temples of its time. The Temple of Artemis is approximately 700 m. to the northwest of the Temple of Hera in the Palaiopolis of Corfu.

The metope of the temple was probably decorated, since remnants of reliefs featuring Achilles and Memnon were found in the ancient ruins. The temple has been described as a milestone of Ancient Greek architecture and one of 150 masterpieces of Western architecture. The architecture of the Corfu temple may have influenced the design of an archaic sanctuary found at Sant'Omobono in Rome which dates to the archaic period and incorporates similar design elements. The massive altar of the sanctuary is precisely rectangular and stood in front of the temple. It was 2.7 m. wide and 25 m. long. Only 8 m. of its northern section survive. The Saint Theodore monastery was built on top of the southern portion of the altar.

== Excavations ==
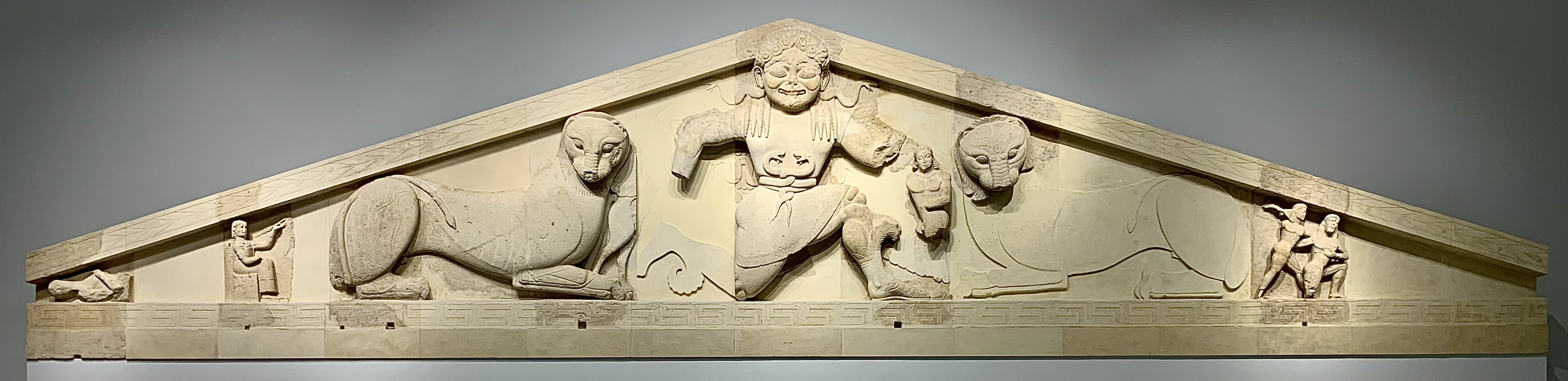
The Gorgon as depicted on the western pediment from the Artemis Temple of Corfu, on display at the Archaeological Museum of Corfu.

The ruins were found during the Napoleonic Wars by soldiers of the French general François-Xavier Donzelot as they were digging, preparing for trench warfare.

Kaiser Wilhelm II, while vacationing at his summer palace of Achilleion in Corfu and while Europe was preparing for war, was involved in excavations at the site of the ancient temple, led by the Greek archaeologist Federiko Versakis on behalf of the Greek Archaeological Society and the famous German archaeologist Wilhelm Dörpfeld on behalf of the German Archaeological Institute, started excavations at the Artemis Temple of Corfu. The Kaiser's activities in Corfu at the time involved both political and archaeological matters. The excavations involved political manoeuvering due to the antagonism that had developed between the two principal archaeologists at the Corfu Temple site.

Wilhelm II had a "lifelong obsession" with the Gorgon sculpture, which is attributed to his attendance at seminars on Greek Archaeology while at the University of Bonn. The seminars were given by archaeologist Reinhard Kekulé von Stradonitz, who later became the Kaiser's advisor.

Little remains today on the site, with only the foundation of the temple and other fragments still existing there. However, the existing ruins have provided sufficient information for the anastylosis of the architectural details of the temple.

== Temple architecture ==
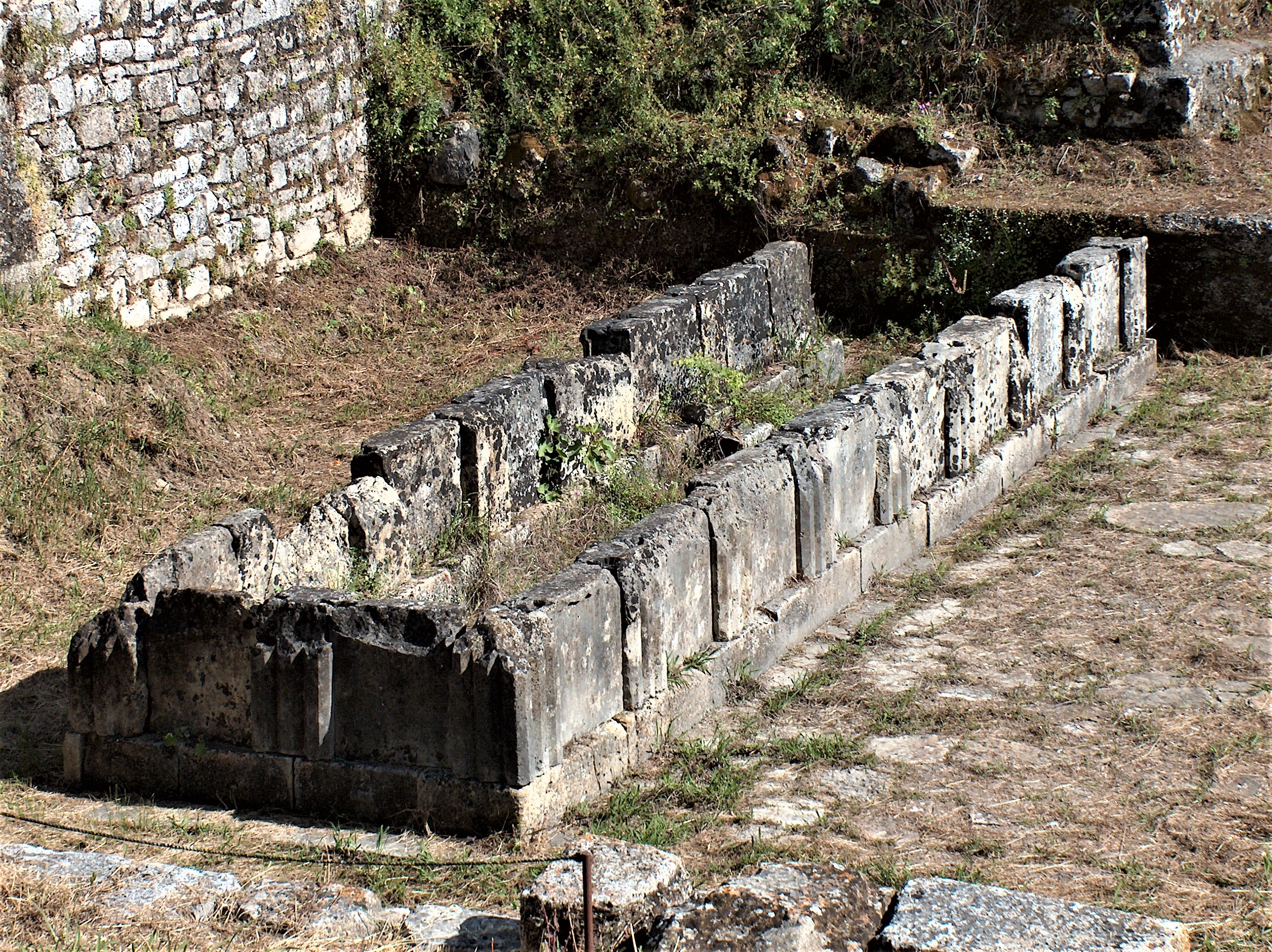
Remains of the altar. Only 8 m. of its northern section survive. The rest of the 25 m-long altar was built over, to create the foundations of the Saint Theodore monastery which was built on the site of the temple. The wall of the monastery can be seen on the right of the picture, south of the altar remnant. The temple was located to the west (right) of the altar.

The temple had a massive altar which was built precisely rectangular and stood in front of the temple. It was 2.7 m. wide and 25 m. long. Only 8 m. of its northern section survive. The rest of the altar disappeared under the foundations of the Saint Theodore monastery which was built on the site of the temple. The temple was located to the west (right) of the altar.

The building was supported around its perimeter by colonnades consisting of two rows of eight columns each for the front and back of the building, while the sides were supported by two rows of seventeen columns each.

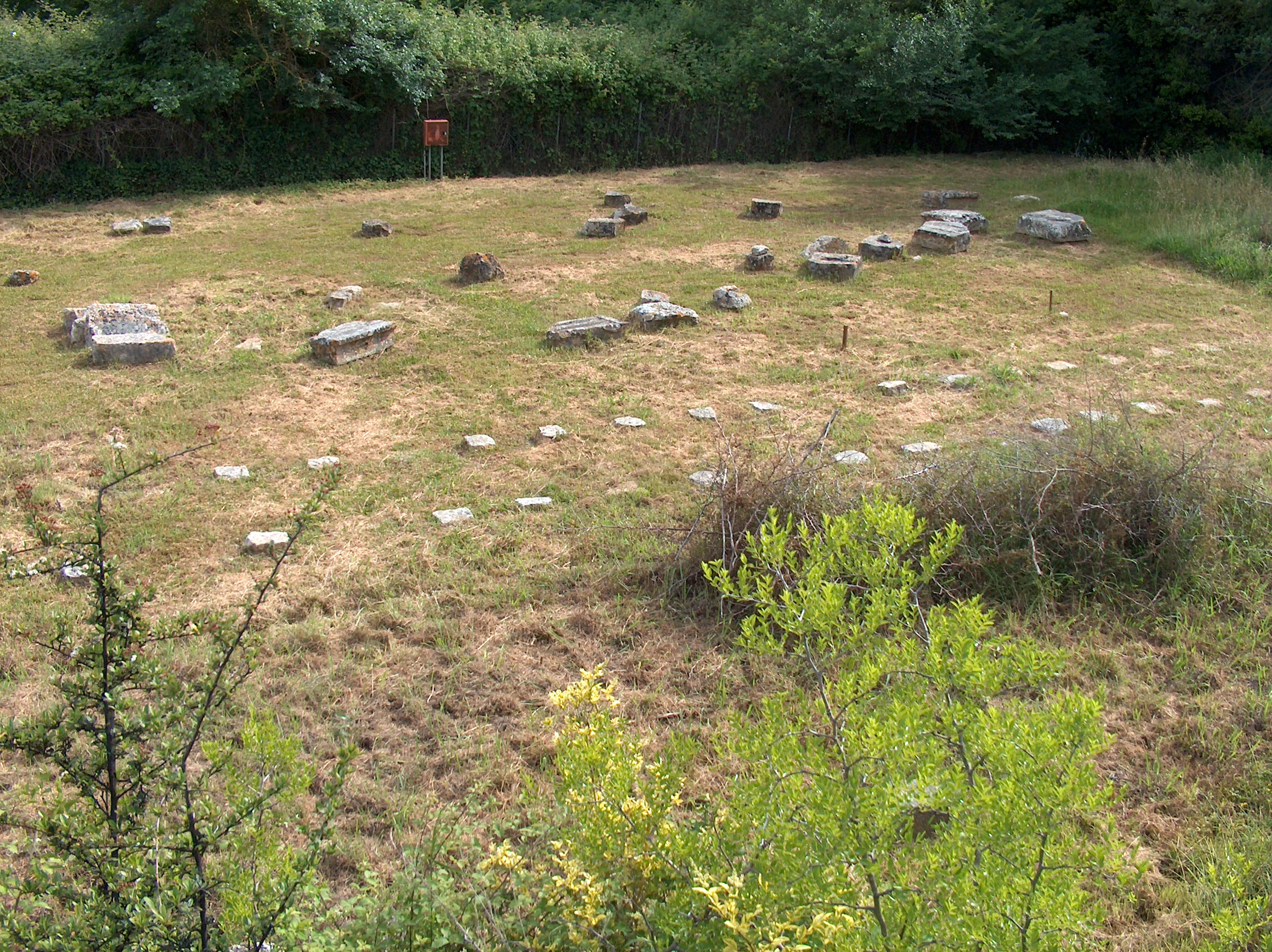
Remnants of the Artemis Sanctuary in Corfu

At the centre of the temple, there was a rectangular inner chamber or cella 9.4 m (31 ft) wide and 34.4 m (113 ft) long, which was subdivided in three spaces by two colonnades consisting of ten columns each. The temple of Artemis in Corfu and the Parthenon are the only Greek temples with eight columns between antae.

The outer colonnade of eight by seventeen columns, also called the peristyle, had enough separation from the inner chamber that a second colonnade could be added in the interior. The Corfu Temple, however, does not have this inner colonnade, for economy reasons. This configuration of a single colonnade, in a space allowing for a second, is called pseudodipteral. The Artemis Temple in Corfu is the earliest known example of this architectural style.

The front and back of the temple featured two pediments, of which only the western one survives in good condition, while the eastern pediment lies in fragments. The pediments were decorated with mythical figures, sculpted in high relief. This is the first known example of a decorated pediment in Greece. Both pediments appear to be decorated in an identical manner and they feature a large relief of the Gorgon Medusa, more than 9 ft. high. The pediment measures 9 ft. 4 inches high at the centre. The sculptures incorporated in these pediments are considered the first substantial specimens of Greek sculpture from a Doric building. The western pediment along with other architectural fragments are exhibited at the Archaeological Museum of Corfu. The pediment has been described by The New York Times as the "finest example of Archaic temple sculpture extant".

== Pediment details ==
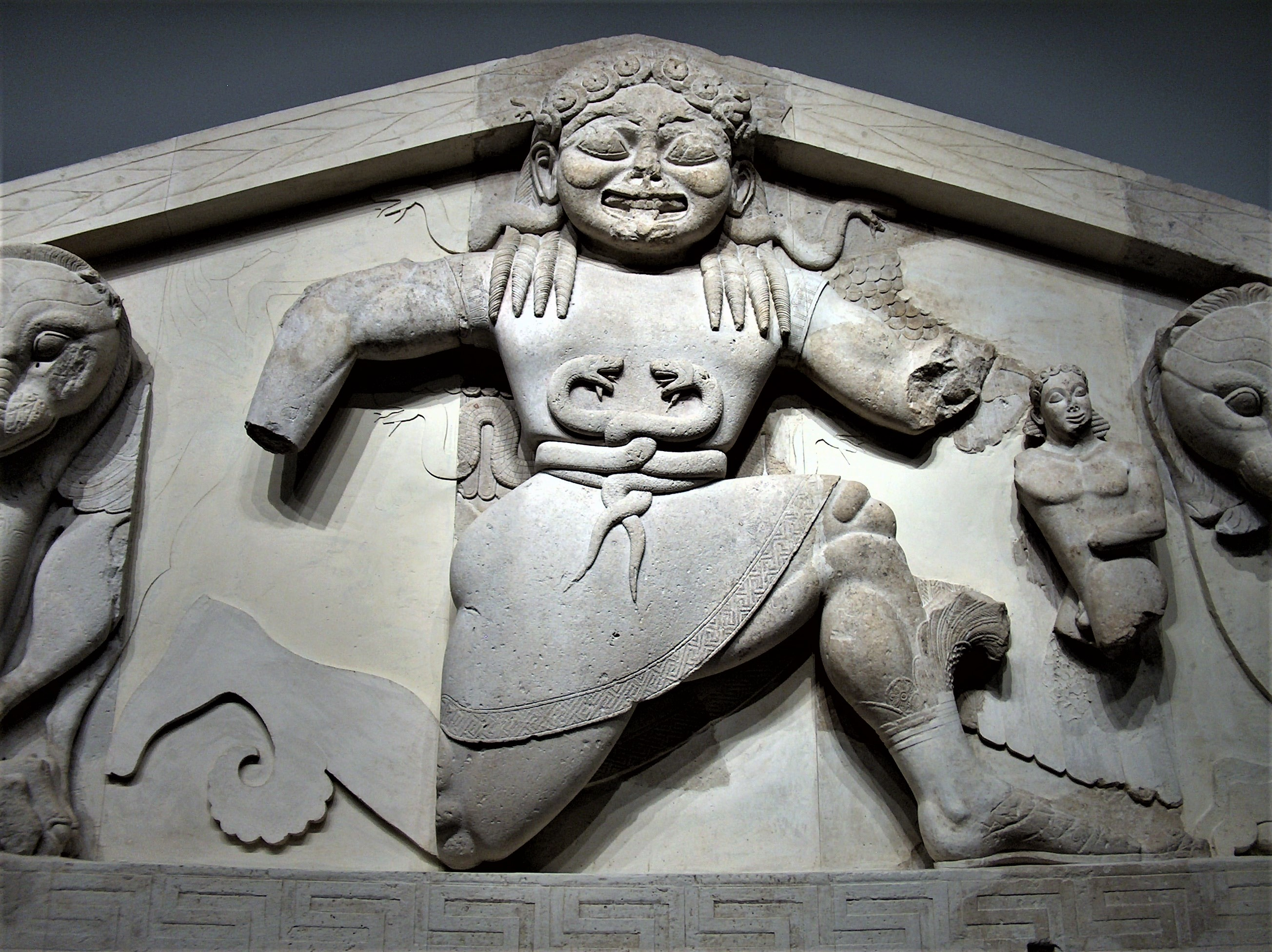
The Gorgon wearing the belt of intertwined snakes, a fertility symbol. To the right of the picture is the small relief of her son Khrysaor

The pedimental sculpture depicts Medusa in a formulaic, stylised fashion; her feet are arranged in a configuration suggesting rotation, which in turn indicates motion or flight when applied to the attributes of Medusa, especially Medusa's wings. The Medusa is wearing a short skirt which allows her legs freedom of movement while she is running. Her motion is further indicated by the formulaic positioning of her legs in the so–called Knielauf position which stylistically resembles a swastika.

The Gorgon is shown with a girdle of intertwined serpents; the girdle is a fertility symbol traditionally associated with female reproduction and sexuality. The presence of the snakes, however, adds a demonic quality as well as an element of danger. Two more snakes radiate outward from her neck. The Medusa figure closely resembles "Mistress of Animals" deities found in the Near East and also resembles Mesopotamian demoness Lamashtu who was the equivalent of the Greek deity Lamia.

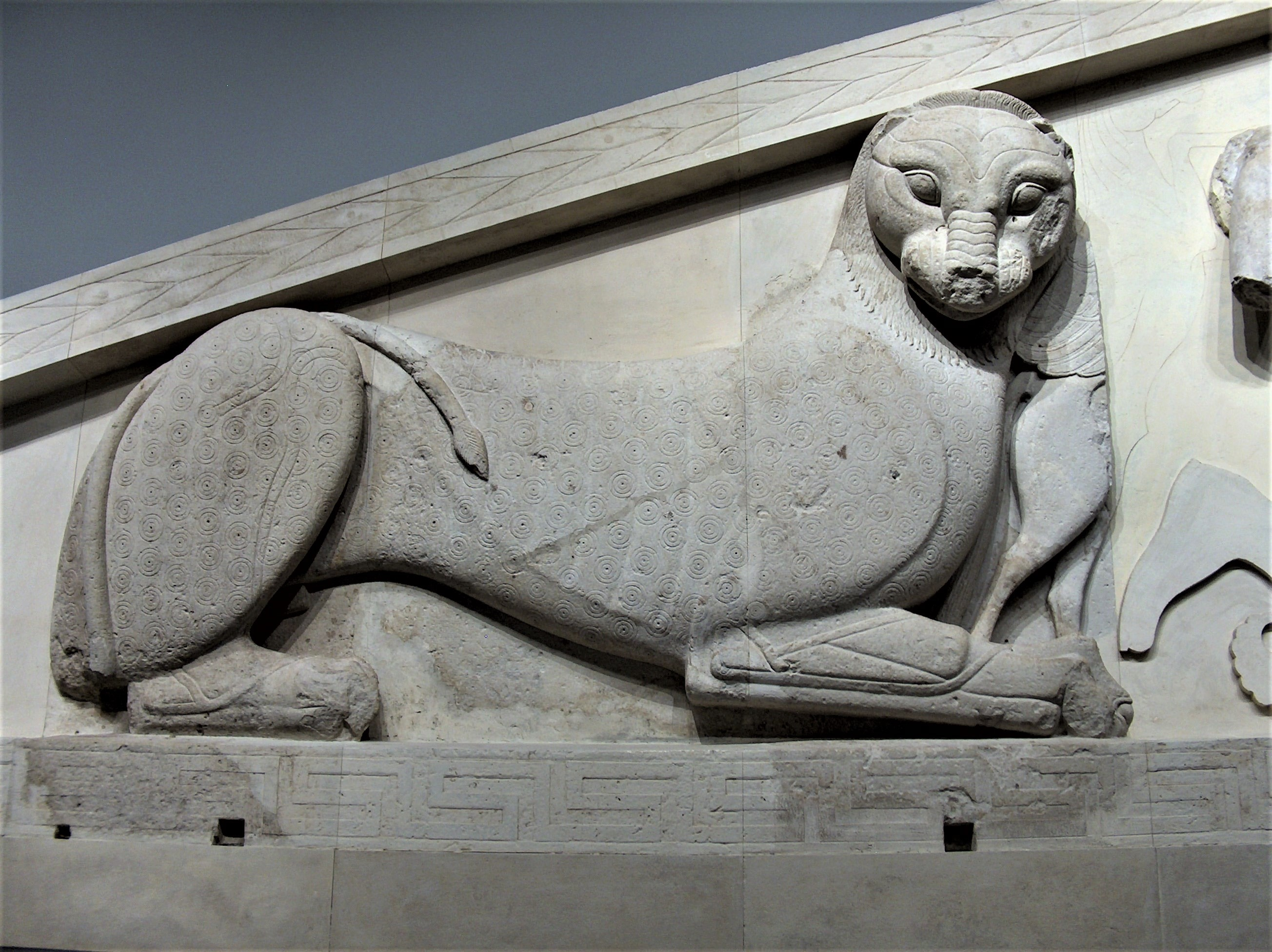
The left panther.

Her children, Pegasus and Khrysaor, are at each side of her, despite the fact that they were born after her death. The face of Medusa is repulsive and shows an evil "archaic smile". The panthers, flanking Medusa on each side, serve as temple guardians and they gaze outward as if to visually inspect their domain. The smaller size of the guardian leopards relative to the pediment enclosure and their high relief indicates that the archaic sculptor desired to disengage the animals from their environment.

The head of the Medusa figure clashes with the pediment outline and evokes a frightening effect. It has also been suggested that since it is unusual for Artemis not to be depicted on the pediment of her own Temple, Medusa may represent the chthonic or demonic side of Artemis, since both entities were patrons of animals. The function of the Medusa and panther figures is believed to be apotropaic, that is, their function was to ward-off evil and prevent it from entering the temple. A gorgoneion (Greek: Γοργόνειον) was a special apotropaic amulet very popular at the period, regarded as worn by gods and royalty as well as others.

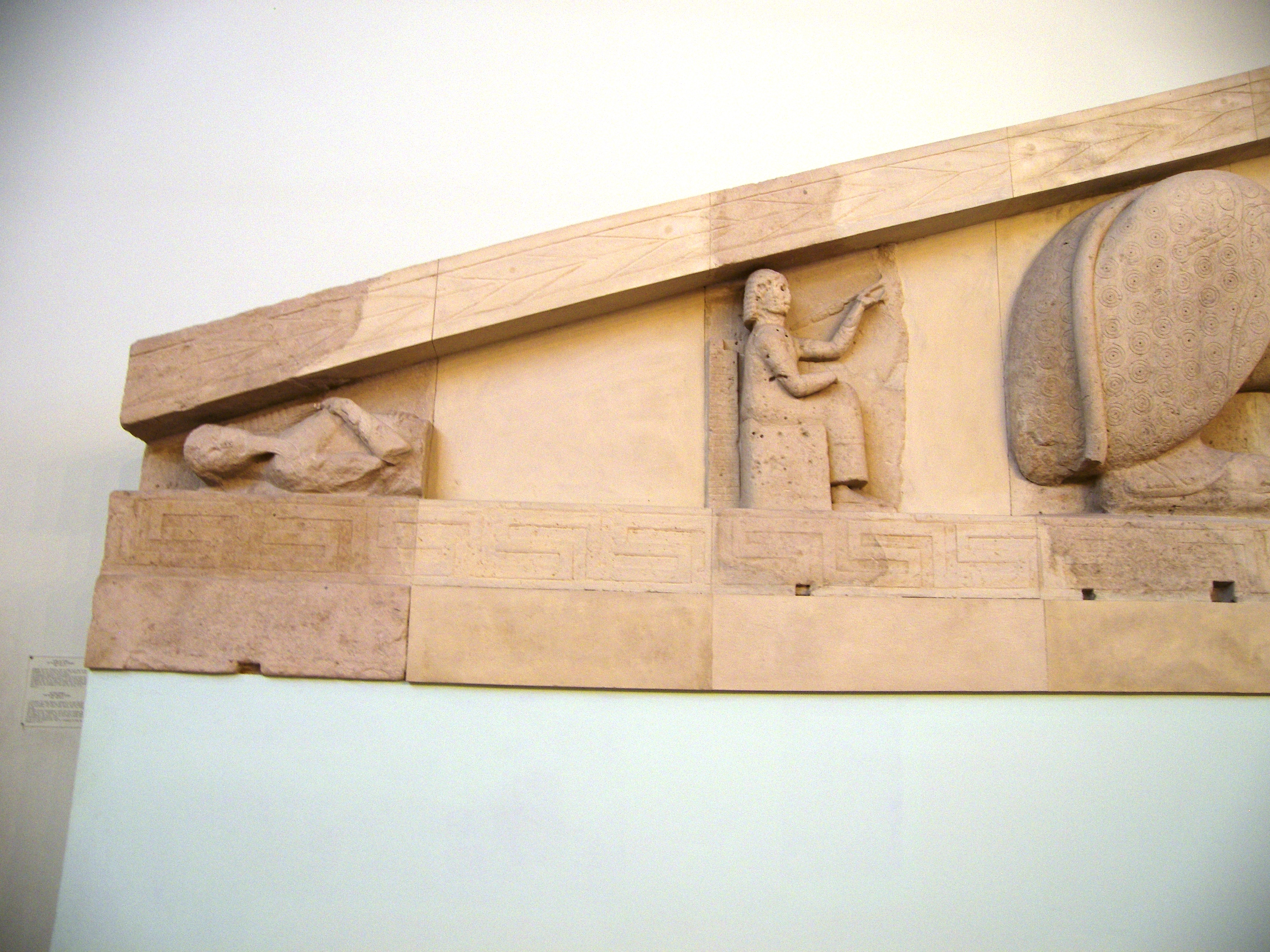
A dead warrior and seated figure on the left side of the pediment.

Behind the leopard on the left lies a seated figure. The figure was shown to be attacked by a spear-wielding figure, which has disappeared from the pediment.

Behind the seated figure, on its left, lies a bearded figure of a dead warrior, facing outward from the pediment. Behind the leopard to the right, two figures are shown. The standing figure closest to the leopard is believed to be Zeus who is depicted in partial profile wielding a thunderbolt against another figure, which faces outward from the pediment. The figure is presented with a beard and is kneeling. To the right of these figures, another relief of a dead warrior is believed to have existed.

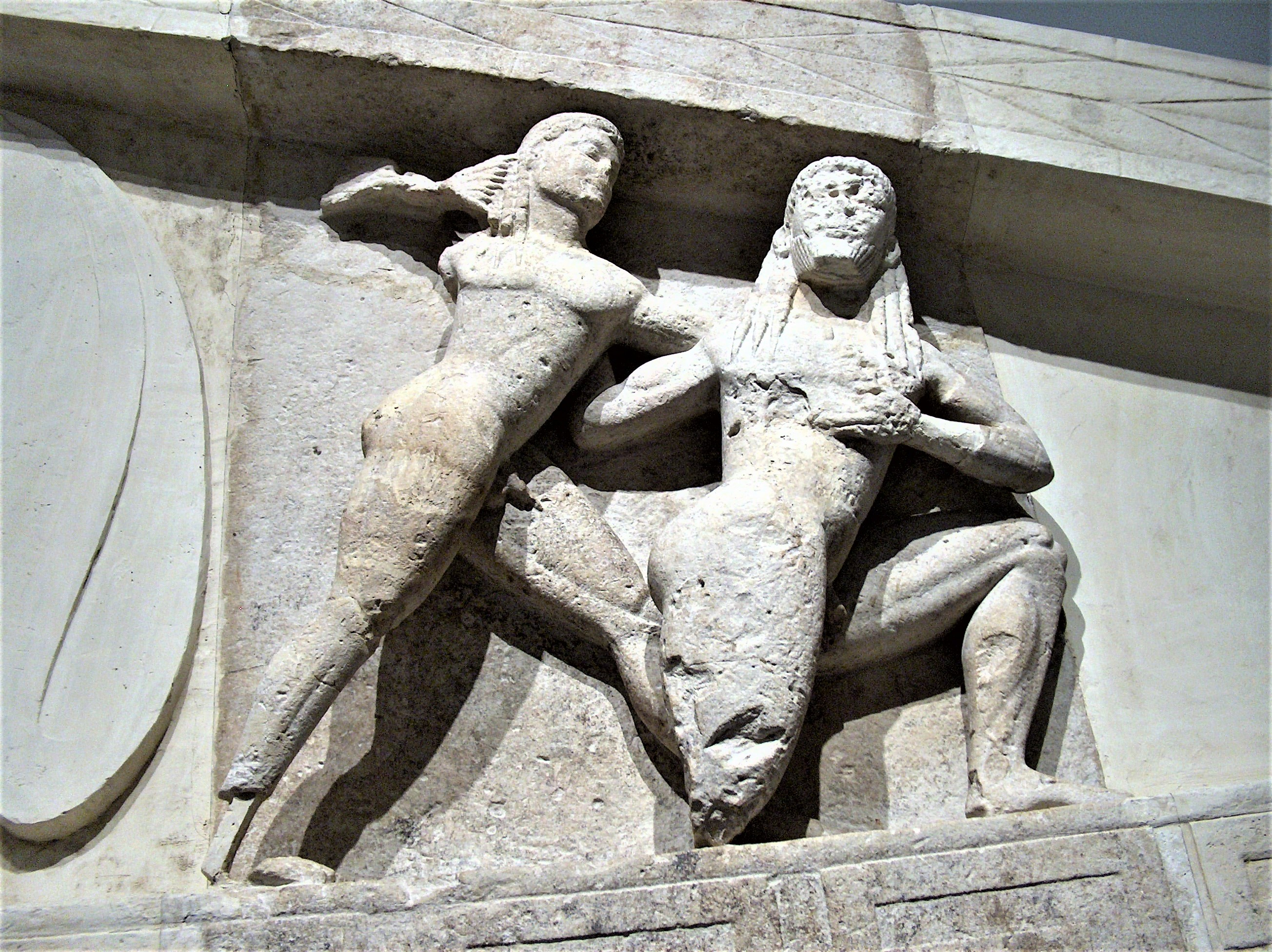
A beardless Zeus is depicted launching a thunderbolt against a kneeling figure.

There are reasons to suppose that the seated figure is Cronus or one of the Gigantes, in which case the scenes depicted to the right and left of the leopards might depict a single subject, the Titanomachy, the battle between the gods and the Titans, which would better fit with a beardless (i.e. younger) Zeus, who is rarely depicted without a beard. There are also arguments that the seated figure illustrates King Priam of Troy being slain by the Greek hero Neoptolemos and that the scene on the left is inspired from the Trojan War. If this is the case, then there are two themes present in the pediment: the Sack of Troy and the Gigantomachy, the battle between the gods and Giants.

Since these figures are not connected to the legend of Medusa, it is thought that the apotropaic function of temple symbols such as the Medusa and the panthers, as guardian symbols of the Temple, is starting to be replaced by the idea of using figures and themes from mythical stories as temple decoration. The decorative function, in time, prevailed over the apotropaic one.

== Film ==
The Gaze of the Gorgon is a film-poem created by Tony Harrison, which examines the politics of conflict in the 20th century using the Gorgon as a metaphor. The narration of the film is done through the mouth of a statue of the Jewish poet Heinrich Heine, which Kaiser Wilhelm II had removed from the Achilleion after he took over ownership of the palace from Empress Elizabeth of Austria. The film describes the connection between Heine, the Corfu Gorgon, and the Kaiser, who had an obsession with the Gorgon. In the film, Harrison's voice narrates:

...what was Kaiser up to?

Excavating on Corfu,
the scholar Kaiser on the scent
of long lost temple pediment
not filling trenches, excavating
the trenches where the Gorgon's waiting
there in the trenches to supervise

the unearthing of the Gorgon's eyes.

== See also ==
- List of Ancient Greek temples

== Sources ==
- Cruickshank, Dan (2000). Architecture: 150 Masterpieces of Western Architecture. New York, NY: Watson-Guptill Publications. ISBN 978-0-8230-0289-4.
- Darling, Janina K. (2004). Architecture of Greece. Westport, CT: Greenwood Publishing Group. ISBN 978-0-313-32152-8.
- Frommer's Review (2011). "Archaeological Museum". The New York Times. Archived from the original on 11 August 2011.
- Gantz, Timothy (1996). Early Greek Myth: A Guide to Literary and Artistic Sources. Johns Hopkins University Press. ISBN 978-0-8018-5360-9.
- Gates, Charles (2003). Ancient Cities: The Archaeology of Urban Life in the Ancient Near East and Egypt, Greece and Rome. New York, NY: Routledge. ISBN 978-0-415-01895-1.
- Hansen, Mogens Herman; Raaflaub, Kurt A., eds. (1995). Studies in the Ancient Greek Polis. Stuttgart: Franz Steiner Verlag. ISBN 978-3-515-06759-1.
- Hurwit, Jeffrey M. (1985). The Art and Culture of Early Greece, 1100-480 B.C.. Ithaca, NY: Cornell University Press. ISBN 978-0-8014-9401-7.
- Janson, Horst Woldemar; Janson, Anthony F. (2004). History of Art: The Western Tradition. Upper Saddle River, NJ: Pearson Education. ISBN 978-0-13-182895-7.
- Kleiner, Fred S. (2012). Gardner's Art Through the Ages: A Global History, Fourteenth Edition. Boston, MA: Wadsworth (Cengage Learning). ISBN 978-0-495-57360-9.
- Marinatos, Nannó (2000). The Goddess and the Warrior: The Naked Goddess and Mistress of Animals in Early Greek Religion. New York and London: Routledge. ISBN 978-0-415-21829-0.
- Merten, Karl (2004). Antike Mythen - Mythos Antike: Posthumanistische Antikerezeption in der englischsprachigen Lyrik der Gegenwart (in German). Munich: Wilhelm Fink Verlag. ISBN 978-3-7705-3871-3.
- Ogden, Daniel (2008). Perseus. New York, NY: Routledge. ISBN 978-0-415-42725-8.
- Potts, Jim (2010). The Ionian Islands and Epirus: A Cultural History. Oxford and New York: Oxford University Press. ISBN 978-0-19-975416-8.
- Raaflaub, Kurt A.; van Wees, Hans (2009). A Companion to Archaic Greece. Malden, MA and Oxford, UK: Blackwell Publishing Limited (John Wiley and Sons). ISBN 978-0-631-23045-8.
- Robertson, Martin (1981). A Shorter History of Greek Art. Cambridge, UK: Cambridge University Press. ISBN 978-0-521-28084-6.
- Röhl, John C. G. (1998). Young Wilhelm: The Kaiser's Early Life, 1859–1888. Cambridge: Cambridge University Press. ISBN 978-0-521-49752-7.
- Schefold, Karl (1992). Gods and Heroes in Late Archaic Greek Art. Cambridge: Cambridge University Press. ISBN 978-0-521-32718-3.
- Segal, Charles M. (1998). Aglaia: The Poetry of Alcman, Sappho, Pindar, Bacchylides, and Corinna. Lanham, MD: Rowman & Littlefield Publishers, Incorporated. ISBN 978-0-8476-8617-9.
- Shanks, Michael (1996). The Classical Archaeology of Greece: Experiences of the Discipline. New York, NY: Routledge. ISBN 978-0-415-08521-2.
- Stieber, Mary Clorinda (2004). The Poetics of Appearance in the Attic Korai. Austin, TX: University of Texas Press. ISBN 978-0-292-70180-9.
- Tataki, A. B. (1985). Corfu: History - Monuments - Museums. Athens: Ekdotike Athenon S.A.
- BFI. "The Gaze of the Gorgon". Archived from the original on 13 December 2013.
