= Temple of Dionysus, Naxos =

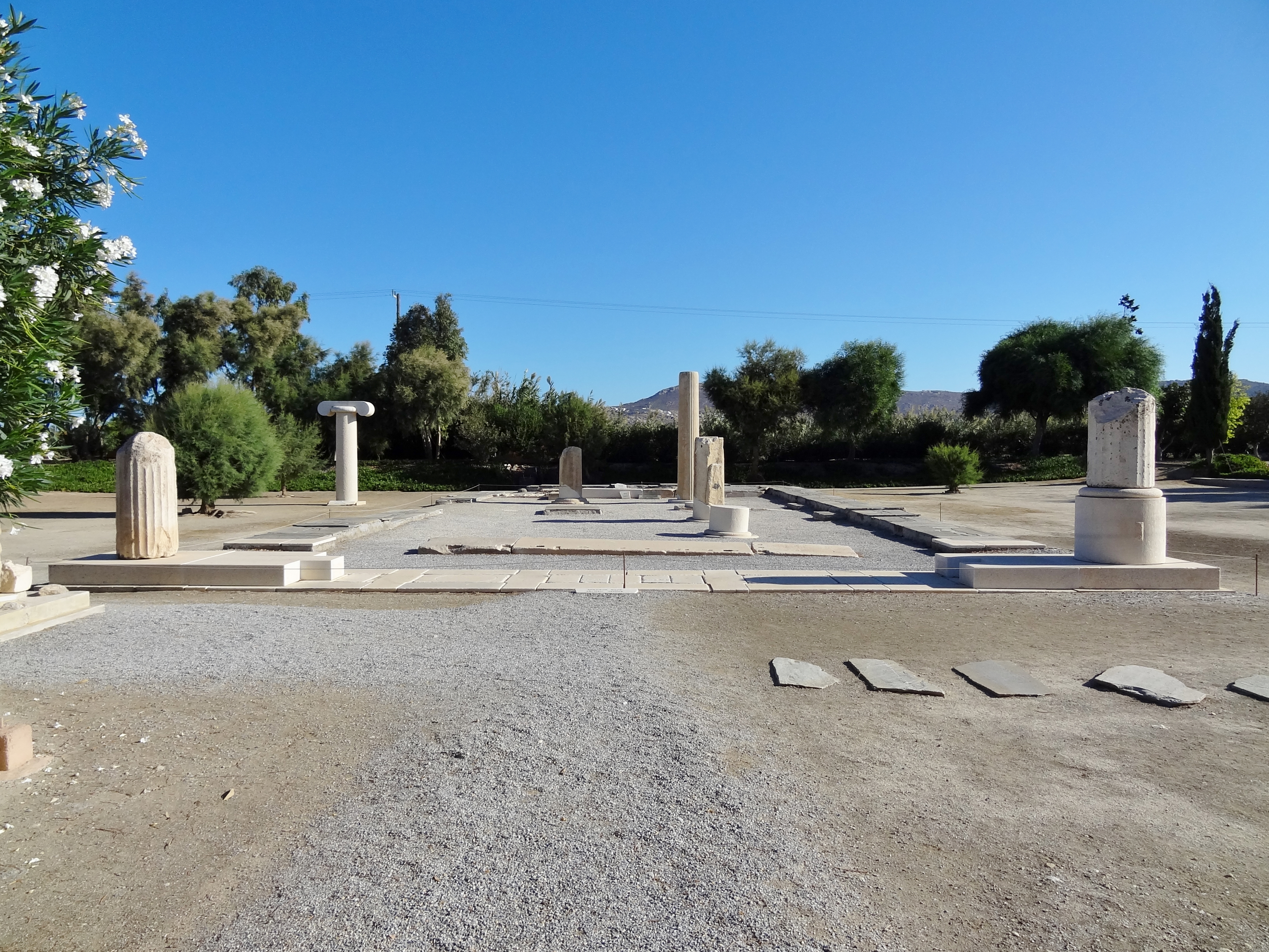
Temple of Dionysus

The Temple of Dionysus was a sanctuary on ancient Naxos dedicated to Dionysus. Naxos was one of the cult centers of Dionysus in Ancient Greece, and the sanctuary at Naxos was one of his main temples along with the temple in Thebes.

The site of the sanctuary was a place for a fertility cult as early as 1400 BC. Several temples were constructed on the site prior to the final temple.

If still in use by the 4th century CE, the temple would have been closed during the persecution of pagans in the late Roman Empire, when the Christian emperors issued edicts prohibiting non-Christian worship.

The site has been subjected to excavation since 1986.

== See also ==
- List of Ancient Greek temples
