= Temple of Hera, Mon Repos =

Archaic temple in Corfu, Greece

Coordinates: 39.6035°N 19.9245°E

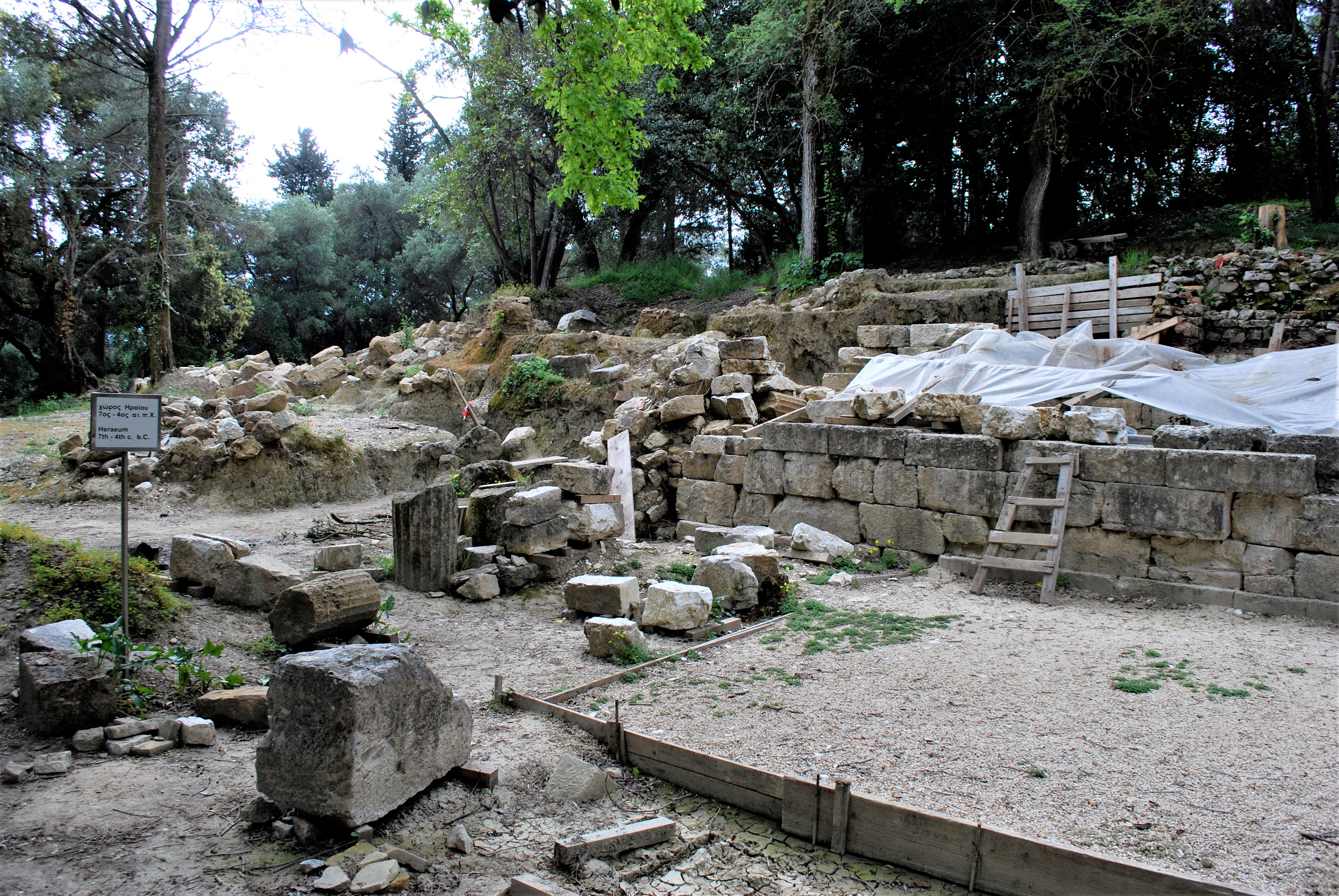
Ruins of the Heraion in Palaiopolis

The Temple of Hera or Heraion is an archaic temple in Corfu, Greece, built around 610 BC in the ancient city of Korkyra (or Corcyra), in what is known today as Palaiopolis, and lies within the ground of the Mon Repos estate. The sanctuary of Hera at Mon Repos is considered a major temple, and one of the earliest examples of archaic Greek architecture.

Large terracotta figures such as lions, gorgoneions, and Daidala maidens, created and painted in vivid colour by artisans inspired by myth traditions across the Mediterranean, decorated the roof of the temple, making it one of the most intricately adorned temples of Archaic Greece and the most ambitious roof construction project of its time. Built at the top of Analipsis Hill, Hera's sanctuary was highly visible to ships approaching the waterfront of the ancient city of Korkyra.

== Location ==
Hera's temple is situated at the western limits of Mon Repos, close to Kardaki Temple and to the northwest. It is approximately 700 m (2,300 ft) to the southeast of the Temple of Artemis in Corfu. Hera's Temple was built at the top of Analipsis Hill, and, because of its prominent location, it was highly visible to ships passing close to the waterfront of ancient Korkyra.

== Discovery ==
Following the discovery of Doric column capitals by workers opening up a road in the hill of Analipsi, German archaeologist Wilhelm Dörpfeld visited the area in 1914 and, for a short period, started excavations on behalf of the Deutsches Archäologisches Institut. Following his excavations, he left, never to return. Much later, Greek archaeologists Giorgos Dontas and Petros Kalligas, working for the Greek Archaeological Service, started wide-range excavations in July 1962, which ended in 1967. The archaeologists published 7 reports enumerating the results of their discoveries.

The Greek archaeologists reopened Dörpfeld's excavation sites and expanded in the surrounding areas. They determined that the remains of the temple had been looted during the Byzantine or Venetian eras and that there were no ruins left at the top of the Analipsis hill, where the temple was once situated. Further, the stratigraphy of the area had been disrupted completely. However, traces of a perimetric wall surrounding the peribolos of the ancient temple were found, which were of substantial height in certain areas. A road constructed in modern times destroyed the western and southern flanks of the temple. To the northwest of the temple, the excavations were affected by dense plant growth.

== Evolution ==
The excavations of the Greek archaeologists were performed over most of the area of the temple and the architectural fragments they discovered are stored at the Archaeological Museum of Corfu. The excavations found evidence that a sanctuary existed by early 7th century B.C. with a major structure being built by the end of that century complete with auxiliary structures and a peribolos. A major fire destroyed the temple by the 5th century B.C. but the sanctuary was rebuilt and expanded and a new temple was built in the 4th century B.C.. The new temple was completely destroyed during the Venetian and Byzantine periods due to looting of its stones which were removed to be used as building materials.

== Architecture ==
The sanctuary of Hera at Mon Repos is considered a major temple, and one of the earliest examples of archaic Greek architecture.

Large terracotta figures such as lions, gorgoneions, and Daidala maidens, created and painted in vivid colour by artisans inspired by myth traditions across the Mediterranean, decorated the roof of the temple, making it one of the most intricately adorned temples of Archaic Greece and the most ambitious roof construction project of its time. The lion elements were geison roof tiles protruding over the walls with water spouts at the mouth of the lion to drain water from the roof.

The Digital Archaic Heraion Project at Mon Repos is a project that has undertaken the task of digitising the architectural fragments found at the Corfu Heraion with the aim to reconstruct in 3D the Temple at Palaiopolis in virtual space.

== Gallery ==
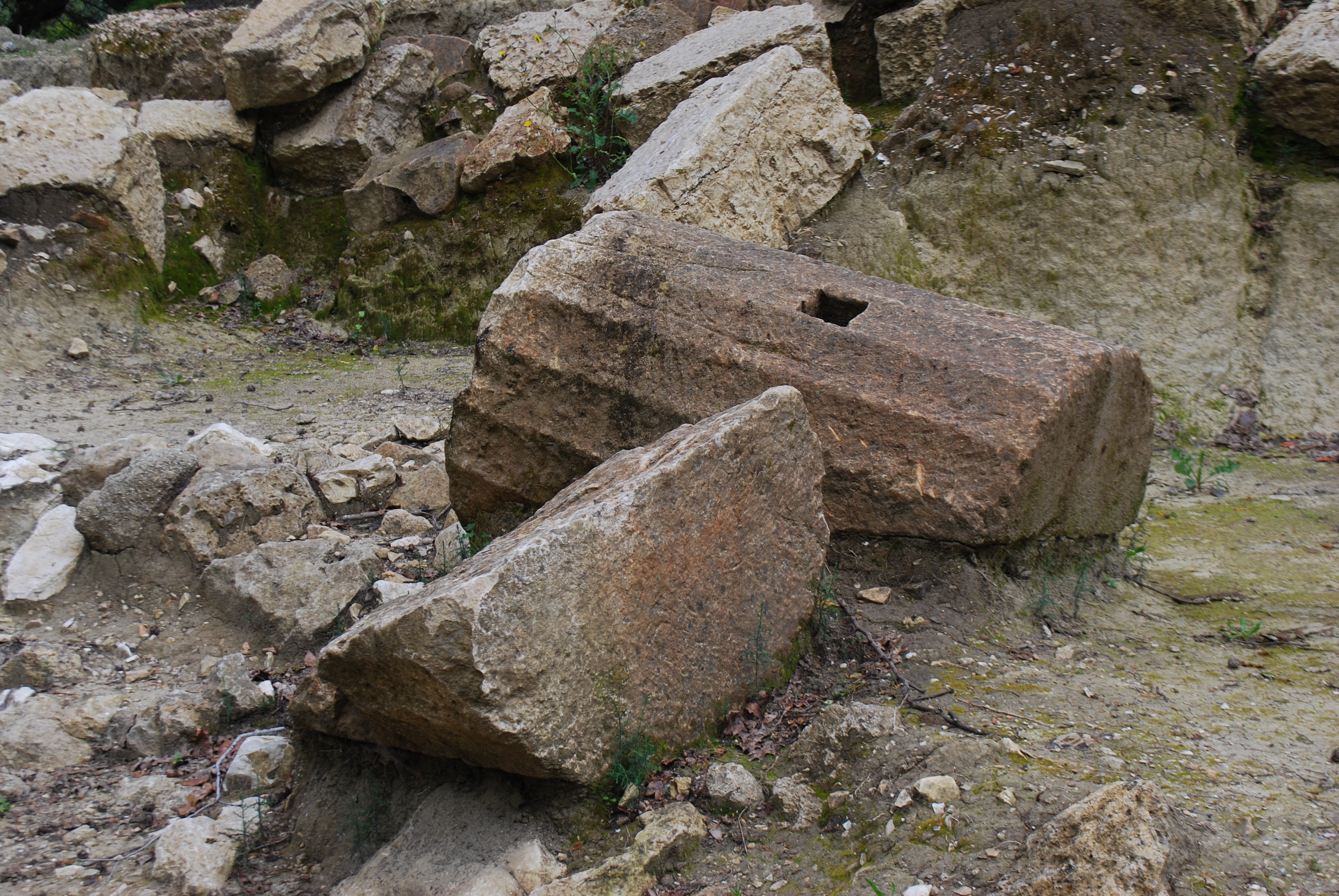
Column fragments

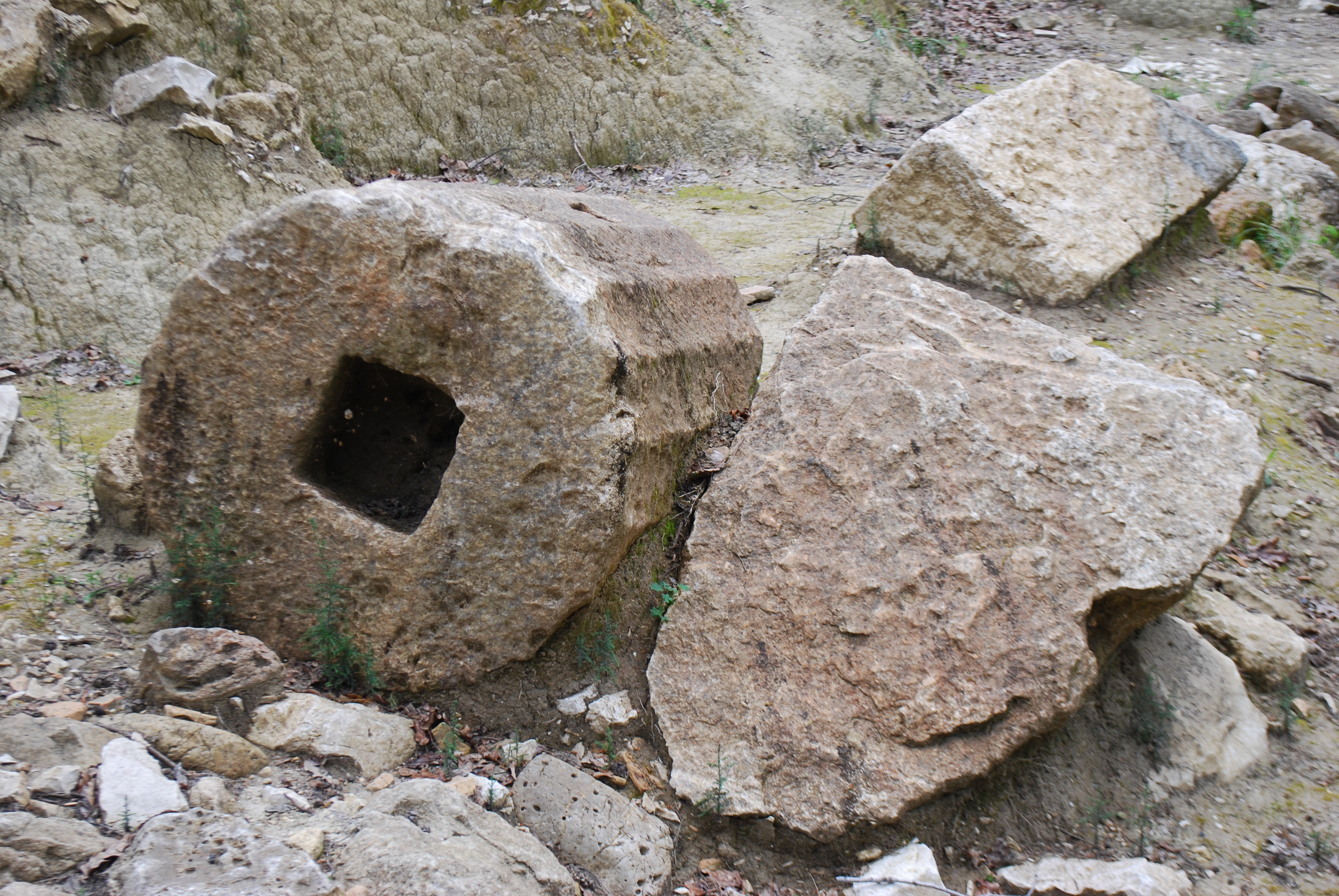
Column fragments

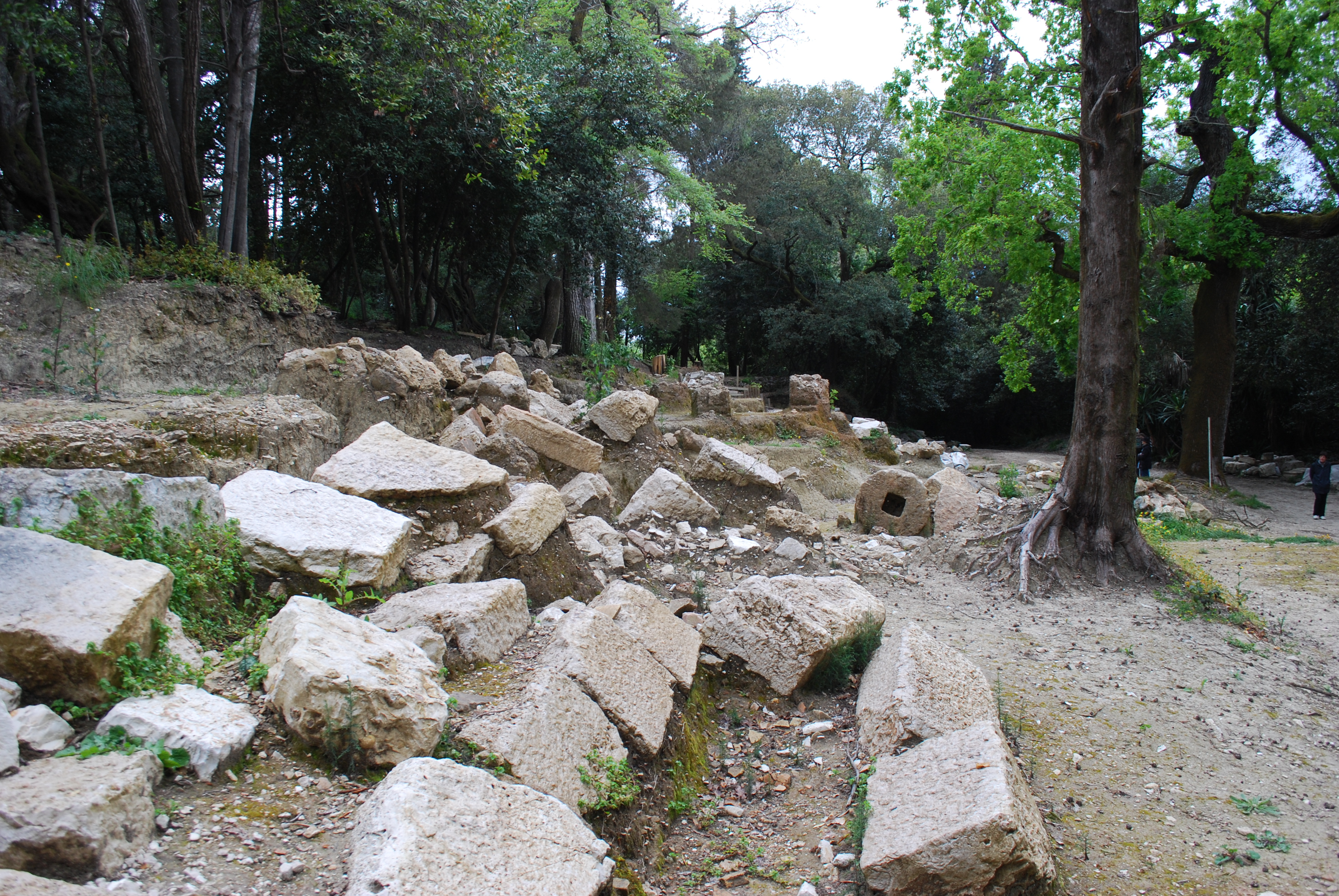
Ruins of the perimetric wall

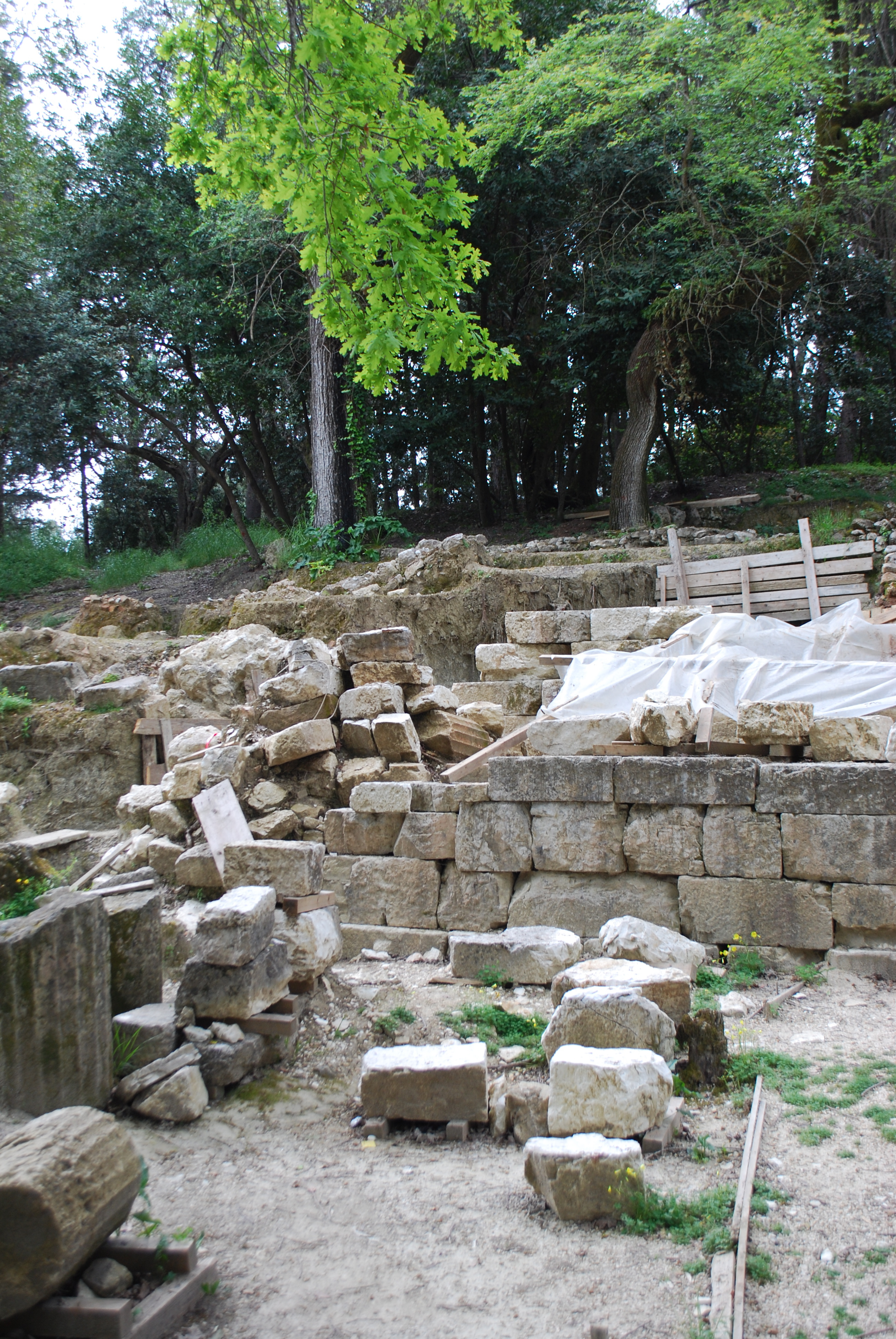
Ruins of the perimetric wall

== See also ==
- List of Ancient Greek temples
