= List of ancient Greek temples =

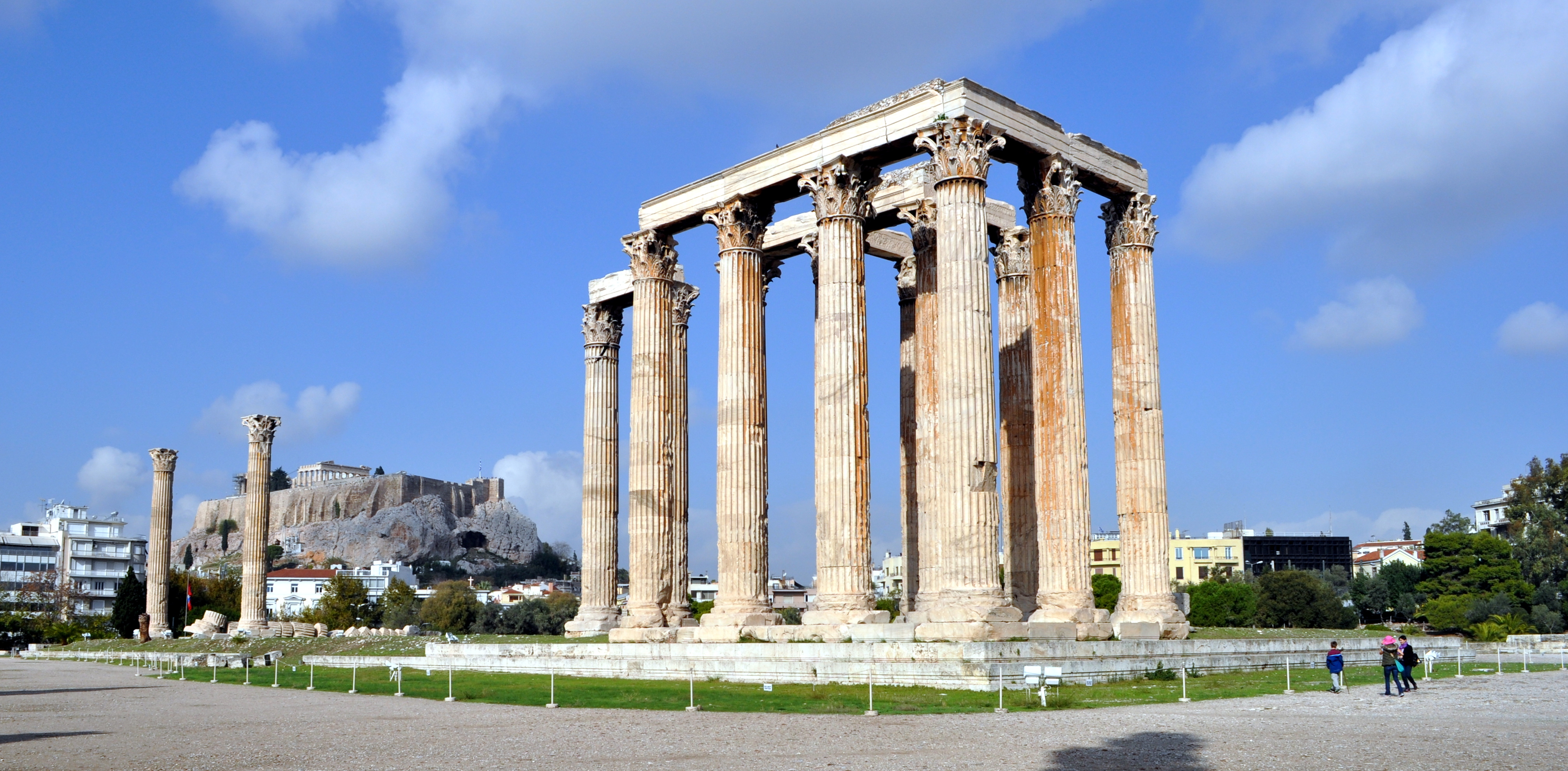
The Temple of Olympian Zeus, Athens, (174 BC – 132 AD), with the Parthenon (447–432 BC) in the background

This list of ancient Greek temples covers temples built by the Hellenic people from the 6th century BC until the 2nd century AD on mainland Greece and in Hellenic towns in the Aegean Islands, Asia Minor, Sicily and Italy ("Magna Graecia"), wherever there were Greek colonies, and the establishment of Greek culture. Ancient Greek architecture was of very regular form, the construction being post and lintel.

There are three clearly defined styles: the Doric order, found throughout Greece, Sicily and Italy; the Ionic order, from Asia Minor, with examples in Greece; and the more ornate Corinthian order, used initially only for interiors, becoming more widely used during the Hellenistic period from the 1st century BC onwards and used extensively by Roman architects.

Each ancient Greek temple was dedicated to a specific god within the pantheon and was used in part as a storehouse for votive offerings. Unlike a church, the interior space was not used as a meeting place, but held trophies and a large cult statue of the deity.

== Overview ==
Most ancient Greek temples were rectangular and were approximately twice as long as they were wide, with some notable exceptions such as the enormous Temple of Olympian Zeus, Athens with a length of nearly 2 1/2 times its width. A number of surviving temple-like structures are circular, and are referred to as tholos (Ancient Greek: "dome").

The smallest temples are less than 25 m (82 ft) in length, or in the case of the circular tholos, in diameter. The great majority of temples are between 30 and 60 m (100 and 200 ft) in length. A small group of Doric temples, including the Parthenon, are between 60–80 m (200–260 ft) in length. The largest temples, mainly Ionic and Corinthian, but including the Doric Temple of Olympian Zeus, Agrigento, were between 90 and 120 metres (approx. 300–390 feet) in length.

== Terminology ==
Floor plans of ancient Greek temples Top: 1. distyle in antis, 2. amphidistyle in antis, 3. tholos, 4. prostyle tetrastyle, 5. amphiprostyle tetrastyle, Bottom: 6. dipteral octastyle, 7. peripteral hexastyle, 8. pseudoperipteral hexastyle, 9. pseudodipteral octastyle

The temple rises from a stepped base (stylobate) which elevates the structure above the ground on which it stands. Early examples, such as the Temple of Zeus, Olympia, have two steps but the majority, like the Parthenon, have three, with the exceptional example of the Temple of Apollo, Didyma, having six. The core of the building is a masonry-built naos within which is a cella, a windowless room originally housing the statue of the god. The cella generally has a porch (pronaos) before it, and perhaps a second chamber (antenaos) serving as a treasury or repository for trophies and gifts. The chambers were lit by a single large doorway, fitted with a wrought iron grill. Some rooms appear to have been illuminated by skylights.

On the stylobate, often completely surrounding the naos, stand rows of columns. Each temple is defined as being of a particular type, with two terms: one describing the number of columns across the entrance front using Greek numeral prefixes, and the other describing their distribution.

- Distyle in antis describes a small temple with two columns at the front, which are set between the projecting walls of the pronaos or porch, like the Temple of Nemesis at Rhamnus.(see figure 1.)
- Amphiprostyle tetrastyle describes a small temple that has columns at both ends which stand clear of the naos. Tetrastyle indicates that there are four columns, like those of the Temple on the Ilissus in Athens.(Figure 4.)
- Peripteral hexastyle describes a temple with a single row of peripheral columns around the naos, with six (hexa) columns across the front, like the Theseion in Athens. (Figure 7.)
- Peripteral octastyle describes a temple with a single row of columns around the naos, (Figure 7.) with eight columns across the front, like the Parthenon, Athens.(Figs. 6 and 9.)
- Dipteral decastyle describes the huge temple of Apollo at Didyma, with the naos surrounded by a double row of columns, (Figure 6.) with ten columns across the entrance front.
- The Temple of the Olympian Zeus, Agrigento, is termed pseudo-periteral heptastyle, because its encircling colonnade has "pseudo" columns that are attached to the walls of the naos. (Figure 8.) Heptastyle means that it has seven columns across the entrance front.

Exact measurements are not available for all buildings. Some have foundations that are intact and have been well surveyed, for others the size can only be estimated from scant remains. There may also be differences between publications where measurements have been in feet or metres or converted between the two.

== List ==
Sorting behaviour (by column):

1. Towns' alphabetical order
2. Towns by region - Greece, Turkey, Italy
3. By the deity's name
4. By date
5. By area size
6. By temple style (1-Doric, 2-Doric with Ionic or Corinthian elements, 3-Ionic, 4-Corinthian)

Ancient place name	Modern place name (country) Coordinates	Temple (dedication)	Date	Dimens.	Notes	Images
Corinth	Corinth (Greece); 37.91583°N 22.99305°E	Temple of Isthmia (Poseidon)	c. 690 - 650 BC	14.018 m × 40.05 m (45 ft 11.9 in × 131 ft 4.8 in)	The date of the Archaic temple's construction establishes when monumental architecture began in Greece, as well as when the transition from Iron Age architecture to Doric occurred. This was also the point at which the Greek temple became a defined form.	
Corcyra (Korkyra)	Corfu (Greece); 39.6035°N 19.9245°E	Temple of Hera (Hera)	c. 610 BC			
Corcyra (Korkyra)	Corfu (Greece); 39.6077°N 19.917706°E	Temple of Artemis (Artemis)	c. 580 BC	23.46 m × 49.00 m (76.97 ft × 160.76 ft)	Doric "peripteral pseudodipteral" temple, which may be the earliest known to incorporate all the major elements of the Doric order. It is the earliest known Doric temple to have been built entirely in stone.	
Corcyra	Corfu (Greece); 39.601523°N 19.926100°E	Kardaki Temple (unknown)	c. 510 BC			
Olympia	Olympia (Greece); 37.63877°N 21.62969°E	Temple of Hera	c. 590 BC	18.75 m × 50.01 m (61.5 ft × 164.1 ft)	Doric peripteral hexastyle building with 16 columns at each side, being long for its breadth in the Archaic style of this date. The building was originally of wood and clay brick construction on a stone base, with the wooden external columns and internal hypostyle columns being replaced with stone piecemeal, so columns are greatly varied.	
Corinth	Corinth (Greece); 37.90604°N 22.87916°E	Temple of Apollo	c. 540 BC	21.36 m × 53.30 m (70.1 ft × 174.9 ft)	Doric peripteral hexastyle temple with 15 columns at each side with two inner chambers on a crepidoma of 3 steps. It was like the Temple of Hera at Olympia, but built entirely of stone. The columns were monolithic with seven of the original 38 surviving. The broad capitals were carved as separate pieces and coated with marble stucco.	
Delphi	Delphi (Greece); 38.48241°N 22.50145°E	Temple of Apollo	c. 510 BC	23.82 m × 60.32 m (78.1 ft × 197.9 ft)	Doric temple on the side of Mount Parnassus, had its legendary origins with the mythical hero architects Trophonius and Agamedes. This, the third temple on the site (330 BC), is by Spintharus, Xenodoros and Agathon. with sculpture by Praias and Androsthenes, retained a hexastyle form with 15 columns at the sides from an earlier building, and was constructed of porous limestone. Little of the temple remains beyond its foundations.	
Aegina	Aegina (Greece); 37.75448°N 23.53306°E	The Temple of Aphaea (Aphaea)	c. 500 BC	15.5 m × 30.5 m (51 ft × 100 ft)	Doric temple which commands a high point on the east side of the island of Aegina, 40 km (25 mi) from Athens. It has a peripteral hexastyle plan with 12 columns along each side, showing the development towards temples that were shorter for their width. The interior has a hypostyle in two stages. The Doric Order demonstrates great refinement throughout. Ceramic roof ornaments and pedimental sculpture showing the battle before Troy have survived. No metopes have been found, and it is thought that they were of wood.	
Cyrene	Shahhat (Libya)32.822308°N 21.862537°E	Temple of Zeus, Cyrene	c. 500 BC	30.4 m × 68.3 m (100 ft × 224 ft)	Doric octastyle peripteral temple	
Olympia	Olympia (Greece); 37.63786°N 21.63010°E	Temple of Zeus	c. 460 BC	27.43 m × 64 m (90.0 ft × 210.0 ft)	Doric, architect: Libon of Elis. A refined peripteral hexastyle temple with 13 columns along each side, in the Classical manner. It had pedimental sculpture of "outstanding magnificence". The local limestone was covered with stucco, while the sculpture, tiles and gutters were marble with bronze acroteria. From 448 BC it housed a colossal chryselephantine statue of Zeus 12 metres (40 feet) high by Pheidias.	
Athens	Athens (Greece); 37.96835°N 23.73305°E	Temple on the Ilisos (Note: No photo exists)	449 BC	approx. 6 m × 12.8 m (20 ft × 42 ft)	A small Ionic temple, architect: Callicrates, beside the Ilissus River which ran through Athens. It was amphi-prostyle tetrastyle. It differed from the small temples and treasuries by builders from Asia Minor in having a frieze around the entablature.	
Athens	Athens (Greece); 37.97556°N 23.72145°E	Temple of Hephaestos	449 BC - 415 BC	13.72 m × 31.77 m (45.0 ft × 104.2 ft)	Also known as the Theseion, a Doric peripteral hexastyle building with 13 columns at each side. It is well preserved externally, having been modified at the eastern end to serve as an Orthodox church. It has internal friezes over the porches at either end and has retained much of the original marble coffering over the ambulatory, some with original colourful paint.	Temple of Hephaestos
Bassae	Oichalia (Greece); 37.42972°N 21.90028°E	Temple of Apollo Epicurius	c. 450 BC - 425 BC	14.6 m × 38.3 m (48 ft × 126 ft)	The architect, Ictinus, introduced the use of all three orders within a single building and orientated the building north south instead of east west. While the ends appear a regular hexastyle temple, it is very long for its width, about 2.3:1 The interior had many unusual features including Ionic capitals of unique design, a central Corinthian column and an asymmetrically placed statue of Apollo, lit by a side door facing the morning sun.	
Athens	Athens (Greece); 37.97146°N 23.72667°E	The Parthenon	447 BC - 432 BC	30.86 m × 69.5 m (101.2 ft × 228.0 ft)	A temple of the Doric Order commanding the Acropolis of Athens. The most renowned of Greek temples and one of the most influential buildings in the world of architecture. Built for Pericles by Ictinus and Callicrates and ornamented with sculpture under the direction of Pheidias. A peripetral octastyle plan, with a ratio of about 4:9. The hypostyle naos contained a colossal statue of Athena. A second chamber, the parthenon or "virgins' chamber" was supported on four tall Ionic columns. While the High Classical sculpture of the exterior is contained by pediment and metope in the Doric style, a frieze encircles the exterior wall of the naos in the Ionic manner. The temple remained relatively intact until the 18th century, from when it suffered several incidents of serious damage. Much of its sculptured ornament is in the British Museum.	The Parthenon
Cape Sounion	Cape Sounion (Greece); 37.65023°N 24.02445°E	Temple of Poseidon	444 BC - 440 BC	13.47 m × 31.12 m (44.2 ft × 102.1 ft)	Doric peripteral hexastyle building, with attenuated columns (6.12 m) and the perfected Classical proportion of being just slightly longer than twice its width and representing, with the Parthenon and the Temple of Poseidon at Paestum, the ultimate refinement of the Doric Order. Remnants of its frieze depicting the story of Theseus and the Battle of Lapiths and Centaurs survive.	
Rhamnous	Marathon (Greece); 38.21760°N 24.02689°E	Temple of Nemesis (Nemesis)	436 BC - 432 BC	10.05 m × 21.4 m (33.0 ft × 70.2 ft)	Doric hexastyle temple with 12 columns on the sides, with the columns left unfluted and the stylobate unfinished.	
Athens	Athens (Greece); 37.97152°N 23.72514°E	Temple of Athena Nike	427 BC	approx. 5.5 m × 8 m (18 ft × 26 ft)	Ionic temple also called Nike Apteros ("Victory without wings"), architect: Callicrates. A small amphi-prostyle tetrastyle temple, which was built close to the Propylaea on the Acropolis. The temple was demolished in 1687 and the stone reused for Turkish fortifications, but were recovered and the temple reassembled in 1836.	
Athens	Athens (Greece); 37.97206°N 23.72652°E	The Erechtheion	421 BC - 405 BC	approx. 11.5 m × 22.85 m (37.7 ft × 75.0 ft)	Ionic temple on the Acropolis of Athens dedicated to Athena Polias, defender of the city; Erechtheus and Poseidon. Architect: Mnesicles. The building is highly irregular, as there are encroaching sacred sites on two sides, and the ground falls away steeply. The main part is an amphi-prostyle hexastyle building with its portico to the east and encircled by a frieze of black limestone previously adorned with marble figures. There are three chambers, the larger dedicated to Athena and accessed by the eastern portico. The north porch is tetrastyle two bays deep and contains a large doorway in a good state of preservation. The southern porch has six caryatids 7 ft 9 in (2.36 m) supporting the entablature.	
Capo Colonna	Capo Colonna (Italy)	Temple of Hera Lacinia	c. 480 BC			
Delphi	Delphi (Greece); 38.48036944°N 22.50796944°E	Tholos of Delphi (Athena)	c. 400 BC	diameter: 14.76 m (48.4 ft)	A circular temple or treasury built by Theodorus of Phocaea which established the pattern of circular temples. An early example of a Doric exterior with a Corinthian interior. The exterior and interior had 20 and 10 columns respectively.	
Epidauros	Epidauros (Greece); 37.59850°N 23.07433°E	Temple of Asclepius	c. 380 BC	approx. 80 m × 43 m (262 ft × 141 ft)	Doric hexastyle building with 11 columns on the sides, architect: Theodotus. It had pedimental sculpture by Timotheos, including acroteria in the form of small statues. The expense accounts for the construction of this temple have survived. (Picture: The ruins of the temple's foundations are in the foreground. The columns are part of the Stoa of the Sick and mark an area dedicated to Asclepius.)	
Epidauros	Epidauros (Greece); 37.59835°N 23.07398°E	Tholos of Polycleitos	c. 350 BC	diameter: 21.95 m (72.0 ft)	A circular temple or treasury, surrounded by twenty six columns of the Doric Order and having 14 internal Corinthian columns.	
Olympia	Olympia (Greece); 37.63863°N 21.62916°E	The Philippeion	339 BC	diameter: 16 m (52 ft)	Ionic tholos, with 18 external Ionic columns and 9 internal Corinthian columns, architect: Leochares It was built as a memorial to Philip II of Macedon and his family.	
Delos	Delos (Greece); 37.40058°N 25.26708°E	Delian Temple of Apollo	470 BC - c. 300 BC	approx. 13 m × 30 m (43 ft × 98 ft)	Doric peripteral hexastyle building with 13 columns on the sides. With other temple buildings inside the sanctuary at Delos. Its completion was delayed. The whole site is in a ruinous state and little of the temple remains except the outer part of the crepidoma.	
Syracuse	Syracuse (Italy); 37.06394°N 15.29297°E	Temple of Apollo	565 BC	21.57 m × 55.33 m (70.8 ft × 181.5 ft)	Doric peripteral hexastyle building with 17 columns down each side and an additional row of columns at the eastern end. The columns at the sides are very close together.	
Athens	Athens (Greece); 37.96934°N 23.73310°E	The Temple of Olympian Zeus	174 BC - AD 132	44.35 m × 110.5 m (145.5 ft × 362.5 ft)	A huge Corinthian temple, architect: Cossutius. Built as a gift to Athens by Antiochus Epiphanes and constructed in 3 stages. It was dipteral octastyle and was long for its width in the style off the much earlier Archaic period. It had 20 columns on each side and a triple row at the porticos, 104 columns, (diameter: 1.9 metres diameter, height: 17 metres high)(6 ft 4 ins; 56 ft). Some of the columns were shipped to Rome before the temple was complete and used for the Temple of Jupiter Capitolinus where they had a profound effect on Roman architecture. It was completed and dedicated by Hadrian, more than 300 years after it began. Only 15 columns remain.	
Selinunte	Castelvetrano (Italy) | 37.58316°N 12.82528°E	Selinunte Temple "C" (Apollo)	c. 550 BC	23.93 m × 63.76 m (78.5 ft × 209.2 ft)	One of a group of Doric temples on the Acropolis or "western group" at Selinunte. (distant view) It has similarities to the Temple of Apollo at Syracuse. It is a peripteral hexastyle temple with 17 columns at the sides and an additional row of columns at the eastern end. Like other temples at this location it had a second room, only accessible from the naos, which was narrow and had no internal columns. The aisles are correspondingly wider. Metopes from this temple showing Archaic sculpture of the Labours of Hercules are in the National Museum, Palermo.	
Paestum	Paestum (Italy); 40.41932°N 15.00536°E	Temple of Hera I	c. 550 BC	24.26 m × 59.98 m (79.6 ft × 196.8 ft)	One of the earliest Doric temples to have survived substantially intact. Also known as "the Basilica", it is an unusual building with 9 columns across the front, 18 on each side and a row of columns along the centre of the naos; peripteral enneastyle in plan. Its columns have very marked entasis (cigar-shaped) and flattened bulging capitals.	
Selinunte	Castelvetrano (Italy); 37.58662°N 12.83480°E	Temple of Hera, (Temple "E")	5th century BC	25.32 m × 67.74 m (83.1 ft × 222.2 ft)	The best preserved Doric temple at Selinunte, it is in the eastern group with Temple "F" and Temple "G". It is a peripteral hexastyle temple with 15 columns at each side, wide aisles and a broad flight of steps to the stylobate.. It has a long narrow naos and inner chamber like other temples at Selinunte but has inner porches at both ends in the Greek manner.	
Selinunte	Castelvetrano (Italy); 37.58727°N 12.83492°E	Temple "F"	5th century BC	24.23 m × 61.83 m (79.5 ft × 202.9 ft)	Doric hexastyle temple with 14 columns at each side. The columns appear to have had a low screen wall running between them. In other ways it strongly resembles Selinunte Temple "C", having wide aisles, a deep colonnaded porch and a long narrow naos with a second chamber. It at the eastern temple site at Selinunte, between Temples "E" and "G". It is in a ruined state.	
Selinunte	Castelvetrano (Italy); 37.58819°N 12.83491°E	The Great Temple of Apollo, (Temple "G")	c. 520 BC - 450 BC	50.10 m × 110.36 m [ 164.4 ft × 362.1 ft ]	Doric peripteral octastyle temple with 18 columns at the sides, in the eastern group at Selinunte, with Temples "E" and "F". It is the largest temple at this site and was never completed. It is now in a state of total ruin. An ambitious building of distinctive plan, having a stylobate rising in two levels and aisles of sufficient width to suggest that either a second row of columns was intended, or that the builders of Sicily, unlike their mainland Greek counterparts, used the trussed roof. The colonnaded inner porch has side, as well as front columns, so that the temple might be termed "pseudo-dipteral". There was a double row of columns within the cella, rising in two stages, of very much more delicate proportions than the exterior colonnade.	
Paestum	Paestum (Italy); 40.42451°N 15.00545°E	Temple of Athena	c. 510 BC	14.54 by 32.88 m (47.7 by 107.9 ft) (47' 8" x 107' 10")	Also called the Temple of Demeter, a Doric peripteral hexastyle building with thirteen columns at the side, having proportions that were to be established as the Doric ideal in such buildings as the Temple of Poseidon at Sunion. The columns have pronounced entasis and the capitals are large and wide. This temple had a number of Ionic features, including the columns of its inner porch and the moulding that ran between the architrave and typically Doric frieze of triglyphs and metopes.	
Akragas	Agrigento (Italy); 37.29082°N 13.58441°E	Temple of the Olympian Zeus	c. 510 BC - 409 BC	52.75 m × 110 m [ 173.1 ft × 360.9 ft ]	Doric pseudoperipteral building with seven attached columns (height: approx. 17 metres)(56 ft) across the front with Atlantes (height: 6 metres/20 feet) between them. The building's coarse exterior stone was coated with marble stucco.	
Syracuse	Syracuse (Italy); 37.05965°N 15.29354°E	Temple of Athena	480 BC	22 m × 55 m [ 72 ft × 180 ft ]	Of Doric hexastyle plan with 14 columns at the sides. Part of the structure is incorporated in Syracuse Cathedral.	
Akragas	Agrigento (Italy); 37.28860°N 13.60013°E	Temple D	c. 460 BC	16.89 m × 38.13 m [ 55.4 ft × 125.1 ft ]	Doric temple built south east of the large ancient city of Agrigento, with the Temple of Concord, the Temple of Zeus Olympias and several others, in an area known as the Valle dei Templi	
Paestum	Paestum (Italy); 40.41997°N 15.00530°E	Second Temple of Hera ("Temple of Poseidon")	c. 460 BC	18.25 m × 60.35 m [ 59.9 ft × 198.0 ft ]	Doric, one of the best preserved temples, showing a consolidation of ideas of design that were developing towards an "ideal type" already prevalent in Greece. It is a hexastyle temple with rather stout columns (8.85 metres high)(29 ft) and a hypostyle naos rising in two stages. Originally thought to have been dedicated to Poseidon	
Akragas	Agrigento (Italy); 37.28963°N 13.59202°E	Temple of Concordia	c. 430 BC	16.92 m × 39.42 m (55.5 ft × 129.3 ft)	Doric temple (Agrigento "F") is a very well preserved peripteral hexastyle building with 13 columns at each side, in the manner of temples in Greece.	
Segesta	Calatafimi-Segesta (Italy); 37.94147°N 12.83239°E	Temple at Segesta	c. 424 BC	21 m × 56 m (69 ft × 184 ft)<	Doric peripteral hexastyle plan, is unusual in having unfluted columns that stand on square plinths in two stages. It also has no cella walls. These features probably indicate that the building was left incomplete, but it has been suggested that no cella was intended.	
Ephesus	Selçuk (Turkey); 37.94968°N 27.36381°E	The Archaic Temple of Artemis	c. 560 BC, lost 356 BC	over 50m x 110m (appx. 170 ft x 360 ft)	Ionic temple, probably a dipteral octastyle plan, with columns having up to 48 flutes, and a varied design on the Ionic capitals which were each 3 metres wide (10 ft). The lower part of each column had an encircling frieze of figures and stood on a deeply moulded torus and, used here for the first time, a square plinth that was to become an accepted feature of Classical architecture. The temple was burned down in 356 BC and rebuilt. Was one of the Seven Wonders of the Ancient World and survived until somewhere around the 5th century CE.	
Samos	Samos (Greece); 37.67190°N 26.88556°E	Temple of Hera (Hera)	c. 540 BC	52.45 m × 108.6 m (172.1 ft × 356.3 ft)	Ionic temple, architects: Rhoikos and Theodoros of Samos, of dipteral plan, having two rows of 8 columns at the eastern end and two rows of 9 at the western and 24 columns at each side. It was built on the site of the earliest very large Ionic temple, destroyed by fire. It was of similar plan, and retained the bases of the earlier temple's columns within its foundations. After its destruction around 550 BC a third, even larger, temple was started nearby.	
Ephesus	Selçuk (Turkey); 37.94968°N 27.36381°E	Temple of Artemis	c. 356 BC	64.3 m × 119.175 m (210.96 ft × 390.99 ft)	One of the "Seven Wonders of the Ancient World". It was an Ionic temple, architects: Demetrius and Paeonius of Ephesus; sculptor: Scopas. Centre of the Pan-Ionian festival. The third temple dedicated to Artemis on the site, it was dipteral octastyle at the front, with the space between the columns increasing towards the central space, where the stone lintel (height: 1.2 metres)(4 ft) spanned over 8.5 metres (28 ft). At the rear, the temple had 9 columns. The temple's stylobate was raised on a high crepidoma (height: 2.75 metres)(9 ft). The Ionic capitals were much less wide than those of the Archaic temple, and the columns had the regular 24 flutes. A feature which appears to have been introduced at this temple was the cubic pedestal between the column and its square plinth. Archaeologists are still uncertain whether the temple had a frieze or not.	a model of the lost temple, as viewed from the back
Priene	Söke (Turkey); 37.65932°N 27.29646°E	Temple of Athena Polias	c. 334 BC	19.5m x 37. 2m (64' x 122')	Ionic temple, architect: Pythius of Priene, of peripteral hexastyle temple, with ratio approximately 1:2. The columns (height: 11.45)(37 ft 6 ins) rest on plinths. Like many other Ionic temples of Asia Minor, there was no frieze.	
Sardis	Sart (Turkey); 38.47921°N 28.03128°E	Temple of Artemis–Cybele (Artemis–Cybele)	c. 325 BC	48.78 m × 91.44 m (160.0 ft × 300.0 ft)	One of the largest Ionic temples. It was dipteral octastyle, with its entrance to the west. It was left unfinished, with further construction around 275 BC and was completed by the Romans. Little remains standing except the foundations, two intact columns and several stumps.	
Miletus	Balat (Turkey); 37.38486°N 27.25639°E	Temple of Apollo Didymaeus	313 BC – AD 41	45.75 m × 109.45 m (150.1 ft × 359.1 ft)	Ionic temple with early Corinthian features, architects: Paeonius of Ephesus and Daphnis of Miletus. This dipteral decastyle temple with 21 columns on each side, was not much smaller than the enormous Temple of Artemis at Ephesus. It was under construction for about 250 years but was never completed. The naos was never roofed, but remained a sunken courtyard in which there was a shrine that housed the statue of Apollo. The temple had a door flanked by attached columns with early examples of Corinthian capitals.	
Teos	Sığacık (Turkey); 38.17723°N 26.78502°E	Temple of Dionysus	193 BC	18.5 m × 35 m (61 ft × 115 ft)	Ionic temple, architect: Hermogenes of Priene, was peripteral hexastyle with 11 columns at the sides. The columns were set on plinths and there was a frieze of Dyonisiac scenes.	
Naxos	Naxos (Greece); 37.02911111°N 25.43127778°E	Temple of Sangri (Demeter)	530 BC		Ionic	
Naxos	Naxos (Greece); 37.1102255°N 25.372360892°E	Temple of Apollo (Portara)	530 BC	38 m × 16 m (125 ft × 52 ft)	Ionic	
Anthela	Lamia (Greece)	Temple of Demeter Amphictyonis	before 5th century BC			
Gorneas	Garni (Armenia); 40.112421°N 44.730277°E	Temple of Garni; Mithra (Mihr)	77 AD – 175 AD		Ionic temple or mausoleum/tomb; hexastyle with 8 columns at the sides.	
Alexandria	Alexandria (Egypt) 31°10′57.64″N 29°53′45.54″E	Temple of Serapis	c. 246 BC – 221 BC	c. 13 m x 23 m (foundations)	According to numismatic evidence, the temple had Corinthian exterior columns (at least four across the front) and a Doric frieze. It was destroyed by a fire, reportedly in 181 AD, and replaced with a larger Roman temple.	

== See also ==
- Ancient Greek architecture
- Ancient Greek religion
- Art in Ancient Greece
- Greek culture
- Greek technology
- List of ancient architectural records
- List of Greco-Roman roofs

== Bibliography ==
- Banister Fletcher, A History of Architecture on the Comparative method, Seventeenth edition, revised by R.A. Cordingley, Athlone Press, (1963) Chapter III, Greek Architecture, pp. 89 – 165.
- Boardman, John (1964). Greek Art. Thames and Hudson. ISBN 0-500-18036-9.
- Boardman, John; Dorig, Jose; Fuchs, Werner; Hirmer, Max (1967). The Art and Architecture of Ancient Greece. London: Thames and Hudson.
- Trewin Copplestone (editor), Lloyd, Rice, Lynton, Boyd, Carden, Rawson, Jacobus, World Architecture: an Illustrated History, Paul Hamlyn, (1968); Seton Lloyd, Chapter 1: Ancient & Classical Architecture
- William Bell Dinsmoor, William James Anderson, The Architecture of Ancient Greece: an account of its historic development, Biblo and Tannen, (1973) ISBN 0-8196-0283-3
- Banister Fletcher, A History of Architecture on the Comparative method (2001). Elsevier Science & Technology. ISBN 0-7506-2267-9.
- Helen Gardner; Fred S. Kleiner, Christin J. Mamiya, Gardner's Art through the Ages. Thomson Wadsworth, (2004) ISBN 0-15-505090-7.
- Marian Moffett, Michael Fazio, Lawrence Wodehouse, A World History of Architecture, Lawrence King Publishing, (2003), ISBN 1-85669-353-8.
- Donald E. Strong, The Classical World, Paul Hamlyn, London (1965) ISBN 978-0-600-02302-9
- Henri Stierlin, Greece: From Mycenae to the Parthenon, Taschen, (2004), ISBN 978-3-8228-1226-6
