= Wilhelm Dörpfeld =

German architect and archaeologist (1853–1940)

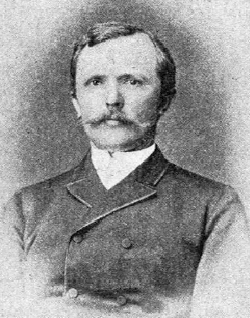
- Wilhelm Dörpfeld
- Born: 26 December 1853; Barmen, Prussia
- Died: 25 April 1940 (aged 86); Lefkada, Greece
- Scientific career
- Fields: Archaeology

Wilhelm Dörpfeld (26 December 1853 – 25 April 1940) was a German architect and archaeologist, a pioneer of stratigraphic excavation and precise graphical documentation of archaeological projects. He is famous for his work on Bronze Age sites around the Mediterranean, such as Tiryns and Hisarlik (the site of the legendary city of Troy), where he continued Heinrich Schliemann's excavations. Like Schliemann, Dörpfeld was an advocate of the historical reality of places mentioned in the works of Homer. While the details of his claims regarding locations mentioned in Homer's writings are not considered accurate by later archaeologists, his fundamental idea that they correspond to real places is accepted. Thus, his work greatly contributed to not only scientific techniques and study of these historically significant sites but also a renewed public interest in the culture and the mythology of Ancient Greece.

== Early life and education ==
He was born in Barmen, Rhenish Prussia, the son of Christine and Friedrich Wilhelm Dörpfeld. His father, a convinced Evangelist Christian and a famous pedagogue, tried to bestow deep religious sentiment to his family so Dörpfeld attended religious schools, where he received basic education in Latin and Greek. He graduated from Barmer High School in 1872, the year after his mother died.

== Career ==
In 1873, Dörpfeld enrolled in architectural studies in Berlin, into the famous Academy of Architecture (Bauakademie). At the same time, he started to work for the Bergisch-Maerki industrial company. His father could not finance his studies and so his sister, Anna, lent him money. During holiday breaks, Dörpfeld worked for the Rheine railway company, drawing sketches of buildings and different architectural objects. Dörpfeld graduated with honours in 1876.

In 1877, Dörpfeld became an assistant at the excavations of Ancient Olympia, Greece, conducted under Richard Bohn, Friedrich Adler, and Ernst Curtius. He later became the technical manager of the project. The group uncovered, among other artifacts, an intact statue of Hermes by Praxiteles. The excavations revived the memory of the ancient Olympic Games and contributed toward the establishment of the modern Olympic Games, in 1896.

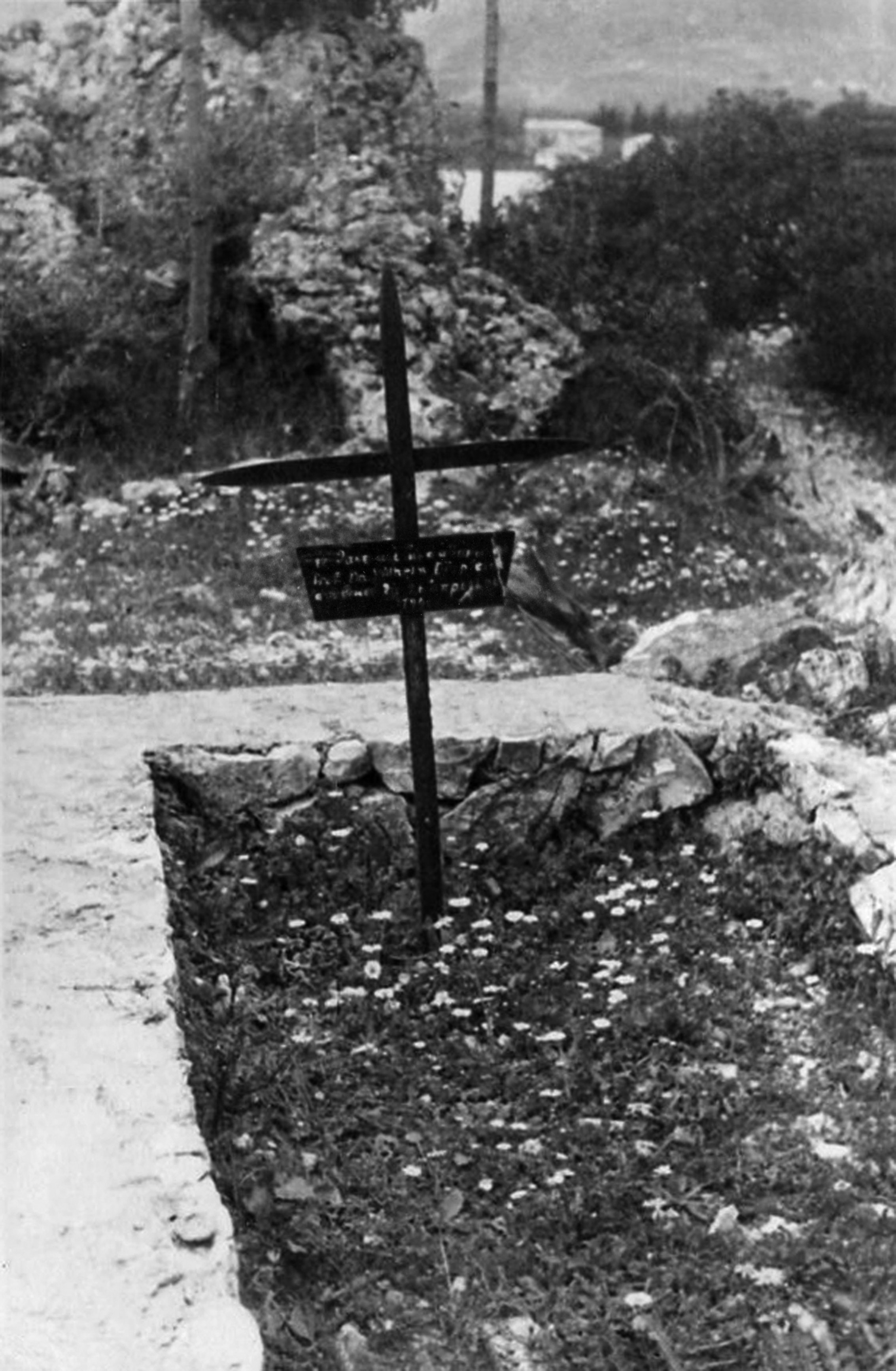
The tomb of Wilhelm Dörpfeld in Vlychos, Nydri, Lefkas island, as it was in 1943, before a tombstone was put on top of it

After his return from Olympia, Dörpfeld intended to take his architectural exam and settle down in Berlin. He needed a permanent source of income, as he prepared for the family life. In February 1883, he married Anne Adler, the daughter of his university professor Friedrich Adler. The couple had three children. Around the same time, he met Heinrich Schliemann, who persuaded him to join his archaeological expedition.

In 1882, Dörpfeld together with a team of archeologists joined Schliemann, who was then excavating Troy. The two eventually became good friends and continued their collaboration on other projects as well. They excavated in Tiryns, from 1884 to 1885, and at Troy again from 1888 to 1890. Dörpfeld also excavated at the Acropolis of Athens from 1885 to 1890, where he unearthed the Hekatompedon temple (the pre-Classical Parthenon). He continued excavations at Pergamon (1900–1913, with Alexander Conze) and in 1931 in the Agora of Athens.

In 1886, Dörpfeld founded the German School of Athens, which was later named after him, as the Dörpfeld Gymnasium. From 1887 to 1912, he was the director of the German Archaeological Institute at Athens. He published, in 1896, Das griechische Theater, the first study of Greek theatre construction.

After his retirement in 1912, Dörpfeld engaged in numerous academic debates on different archaeological topics. For example, in the mid-1930s, he took part in a celebrated debate with American archaeologist William Bell Dinsmoor on the nature of configuration of the three phases of the Parthenon. At the beginning of the 1920s, he started to lecture at the University of Jena but was not satisfied with teaching as a profession and so returned to Greece.

In 1914 Döperfield became a signatory of the Manifesto of the Ninety-Three, a manifesto in which 93 prominent academic figures in Germany endorsed the early German military action of World War 1. Many of the signatories would later express regret in the signing of said document.

Dörpfeld died in 1940 on the island of Lefkada, Greece, where he had a house, believing that the bay of Nidri on the eastern coast of Lefkada was the historical Ithaca, home of Odysseus in Homer's Odyssey.

== Work ==
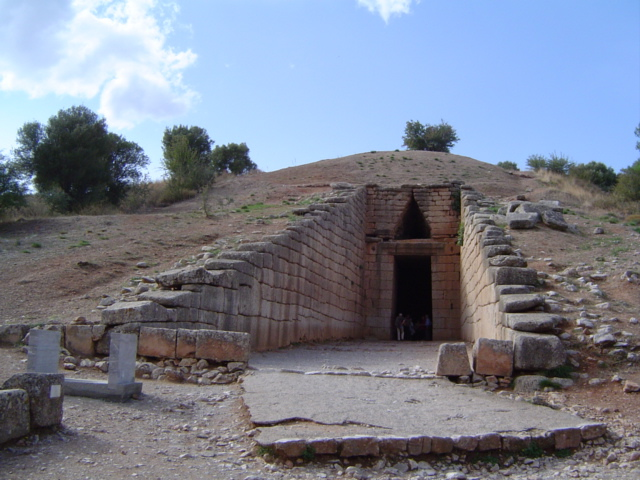
The "Treasury of Atreus" is the most impressive of the "tholos" tombs at Mycenae

He developed a method of dating archaeological sites by the strata in which objects were found and the type of materials used for the buildings. He corrected many of Schliemann's previous conclusions, including the shaft burial sites at Mycenae. Dörpfeld realized that the site was a tholos tomb, not the "Treasury of Atreus", as Schliemann claimed.

During the excavations of Panagiotis Kavvadias on the Acropolis of Athens, Dörpfeld was instrumental in correcting the previous belief that the temple of Athena, destroyed by the Persians in 480 BCE, was not beneath the Parthenon but to the north of it. He suggested the three different structures were built in the same place and spoke thus of Parthenon I, Parthenon II, and Parthenon III, applying the last term to the temple which is now there. Besides suggesting the existence of the two previous proto-Parthenons, he was able to reconstruct the dimensions of their ground plans.

After Schliemann's death in 1890, his widow hired Dörpfeld to continue from where Schliemann had stopped in his excavations of Troy. Dörpfeld found nine separate cities, one atop the other, at the Hisarlik site. He argued that the sixth was the legendary Troy because it was larger than the first five cities and had high limestone walls, surrounding the city. Dörpfeld also found evidence for his claims in Mycenaean pottery, which he found in the same strata. Modern archaeologists, however, think that Homer wrote about Troy VII instead.

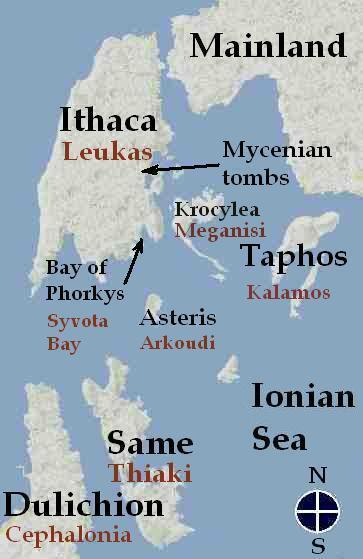
Map of Homer's Ithaca according to Dörpfeld's theory

Dörpfeld spent a lot of time and energy trying to prove that Homer's epics were based on historical facts. He proposed that the bay of Nidri, on the eastern coast of Lefkada, was Ithaca, home of Odysseus. Dörpfeld compared several passages from the Odyssey to the actual geographical location of Lefkada, and he concluded that it must be the Homeric Ithaca. He was especially convinced by the passage:

I dwell in shining Ithaca. There is a mountain there,
high Neriton, covered in forests. Many islands
lie around it, very close to each other,
Doulichion, Same, and wooded Zacynthos—
but low-lying Ithaca is farthest out to sea,
towards the sunset, and the others are apart, towards the dawn and sun.
It is rough, but it raises good men." Homer, Odyssey 9.1:

Lefkada is connected today to Mainland Greece by a causeway and floating bridge, but in ancient times, it was connected to the mainland by a narrow strip of land, making it a peninsula rather than an island. The strip of land was cut through by the Corinthians in the 7th century BCE. Modern geographers and hydrographers, however, have claimed that ancient Lefkada was an island. They noted that the causeway that connects it to the mainland today is a recent product of silting in the channel and so Lefkada may have experienced varying degrees of connection with the mainland over the last few thousand years. Dörpfeld may have believed that Lefkada was a freestanding island (or was regarded as such) at the time of Homer's descriptions, in accordance with the above passage. Dörpfeld may also have felt that the difficulty of crossing the narrow causeway was referred to in Homer's enigmatic and repeated jest, "For nowise, methinks, didst thou come hither on foot".Homer, Odyssey 14.190, 16.224. In 1912–1914, Dörpfeld obtained permission from the King of Greece to excavate the area of Kardaki Temple, because it was part of the King's vacation home of Mon Repos. Dörpfeld published his results in two brief notes without illustrations in the Archäologischer Anzeiger. He also excavated the Temple of Hera in Corfu.

== Legacy ==
He was one of the seminal figures in classical archaeology. His stratigraphic method of dating archaeological sites, based on the strata in which objects were found and the type of building materials, remains at the core in archaeological site analyses. His excavations, however, had many flaws, and his seeking to prove that Homer based his Odyssey on real places was rather romantic. His fellow archaeologists remarked that he overemphasised the importance of buildings in the dating of sites and often neglected less visible artifacts, such as pottery. Dörpfeld, however, remains known as one who brought much order and integrity into archaeology, and one who saved many archaeological sites from Schliemann's reckless excavations.

In 1924, botanists (Britton) Urb. first published and described a plant found in Cuba, called Doerpfeldia cubensis in Symb. Antill. Vol.9 on page 218, its genus name honours Dörpfeld.

== Publications ==
(see also external links: Wikisource)

- Dörpfeld, Wilhelm. Das griechische Theater. Berlin: Weidmannsche Buchhandlung, 1896.
- Dörpfeld, Wilhelm. Troja und Ilion. Athens: Beck & Barth, 1902.
- Dörpfeld, Wilhelm. Olympia in römischer Zeit. Berlin: Weidmannsche Buchhandlung, 1914.
- Dörpfeld, Wilhelm. Alt-Ithaka: Ein Beitrag zur Homer-Frage, Studien und Ausgrabungen aus der insel Leukas-Ithaka. München: R. Uhde, 1927.
- Dörpfeld, Wilhelm. Alt-Olympia: Untersuchungen und Ausgrabungen zur Geschichte des ältesten Heiligtums von Olympia und der älteren griechischen Kunst. Berlin: E. S. Mittler & Sohn, 1935.
- Dörpfeld, Wilhelm. Meine Tätigkeit für die griechische Archäologische Gesellschaft. Athenais: Archaiologikē Hetaireia, 1937.
- Dörpfeld, Wilhelm, and Walther Kolbe. Die beiden vorpersischen Tempel unter dem Parthenon des Perikles. Berlin: Verlag von E.S. Mittler & Sohn, 1937.

== See also ==
- Rudolf Carnap

== Sources ==
- Bittlestone, Robert, James Diggle, and John Underhill. Odysseus unbound: The search for Homer's Ithaca. Cambridge University Press, 2005. ISBN 0-521-85357-5
- Dörpfeld, Wilhelm. arthistorians.info. Retrieved 20 July 2007.
- Harris, E. C. Principles of Archaeological Stratigraphy (2nd Ed.). Academic Press: London and San Diego, 1989. ISBN 0-12-326651-3
- Kawerau, Georg. The excavation of the Athenian Acropolis 1882-1890: The original drawings. Copenhagen: Gyldendal, 1974. ISBN 87-00-54491-4
- Schuchhardt, Carl. Schliemann's discoveries of the ancient world. Avenel Books, 1979. ISBN 0-517-27930-4
- Tolman, Cushing H. Mycenaean Troy: Based on Dörpfeld's excavations in the sixth of the nine buried cities at Hissarlik. American Book Co., 1903.
- Trigger, Bruce G. A history of archaeological thought. Cambridge University Press, 2006. ISBN 0-521-84076-7
