= Pseudodipteral =

The plan of temple "G" in Selinunte

Pseudodipteral or Pseudodipteros (Greek: ψευδοδίπτερος, meaning “falsely dipteral”) describes an ancient Greek temple with a single peristyle surrounding the cella at the distance of two intercolumns and one column. Unlike peripteral temples, there is a greater space between the columns of the peristyle and the cella; dipteral temples have two peristyles.

Temple "G" in Selinunte, an ancient Greek archaeological site in Italy, is a good example of the pseudodipteral plan.
