= Corcyra (polis) =

Ancient Greek city on the island of Corfu

Coordinates: 39°36′26″N 19°55′06″E

- Κόρκυρα (Greek)
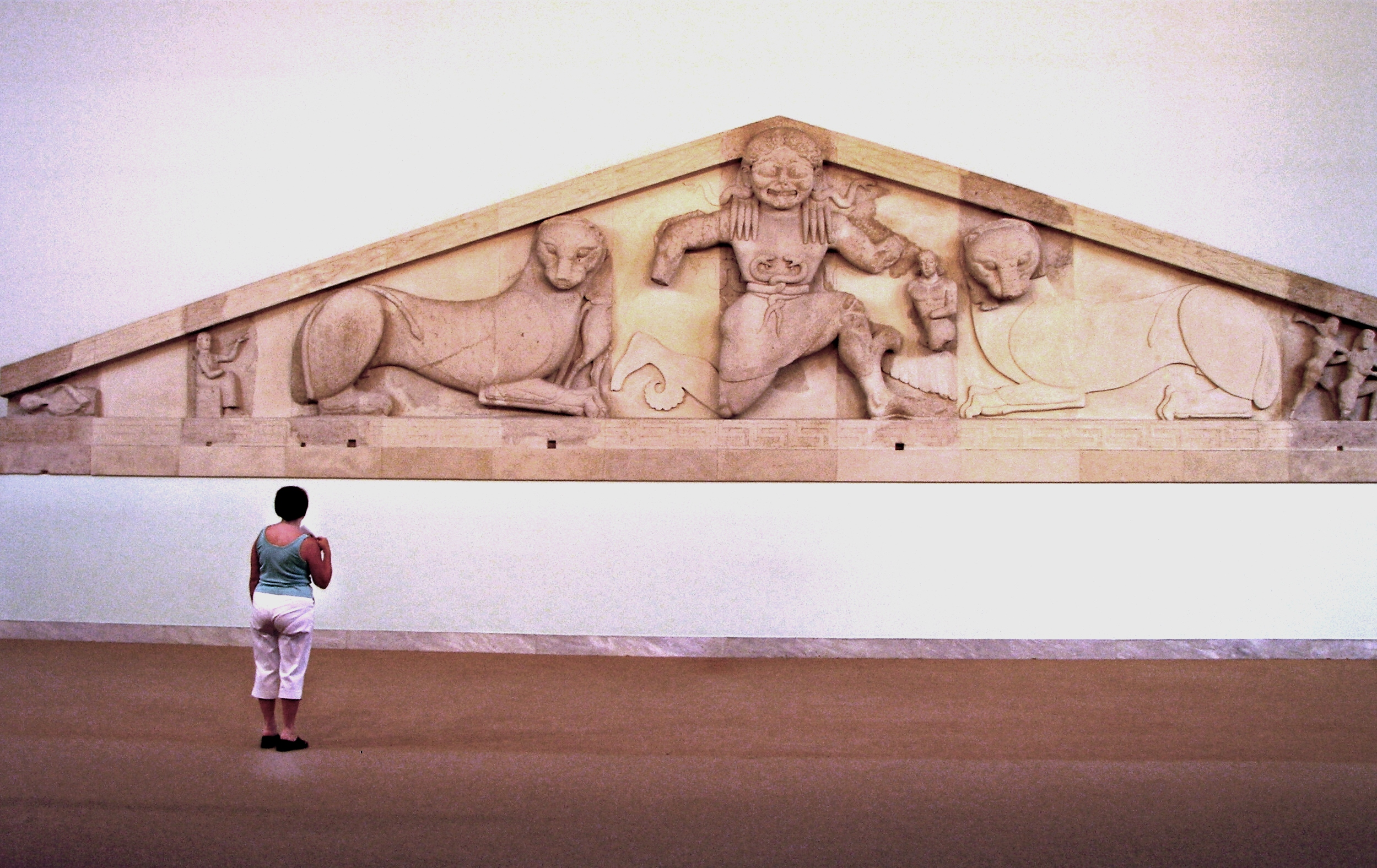
- Gorgon at the Archaeological Museum in Corfu

- Location within Greece
- Type: Settlement
- Cultures: Ancient Greece
- Location: Corfu, Greece

Corcyra (also Korkyra /kɔːrˈsaɪ.rə/; Ancient Greek: Κόρκυρα) was an ancient Greek city on the island of Corfu in the Ionian Sea adjacent to Epirus. It was a colony of Corinth founded in the Archaic period. Corcyra acted as a port of call for ships sailing west, especially to the Italian coast or farther north. According to Thucydides, the earliest recorded naval battle took place between Corcyra and Corinth in the mid-7th century BC, roughly 260 years before he was writing. He also writes that Corcyra was one of the three great naval powers in 5th-century BC Greece, along with Athens and Corinth.

The antagonism between Corcyra and its mother city, Corinth, appears to have been an old one. Quite apart from the naval battle that Thucydides mentions, Herodotus records a myth involving the tyrant of Corinth, Periander. Periander was estranged from his younger son, Lycophron, who believed that his father had killed his mother, Milissa. After failing to reconcile with Lycophron, he sent him to Corcyra, which was within Corinth's governance. In his old age, Periander sent for his son to come and rule over Corinth, and suggested that they would trade places: he would rule Corcyra while his son ruled Corinth. To prevent that, the Corcyraeans killed Lycophron. In punishment, Periander captured 300 young men of Corcyra with the intention of castrating them. That is more likely to be a myth explaining the animosity between Corinth and Corcyra and justifying the use of the word tyrant for Periander's rule than an actual historical event.

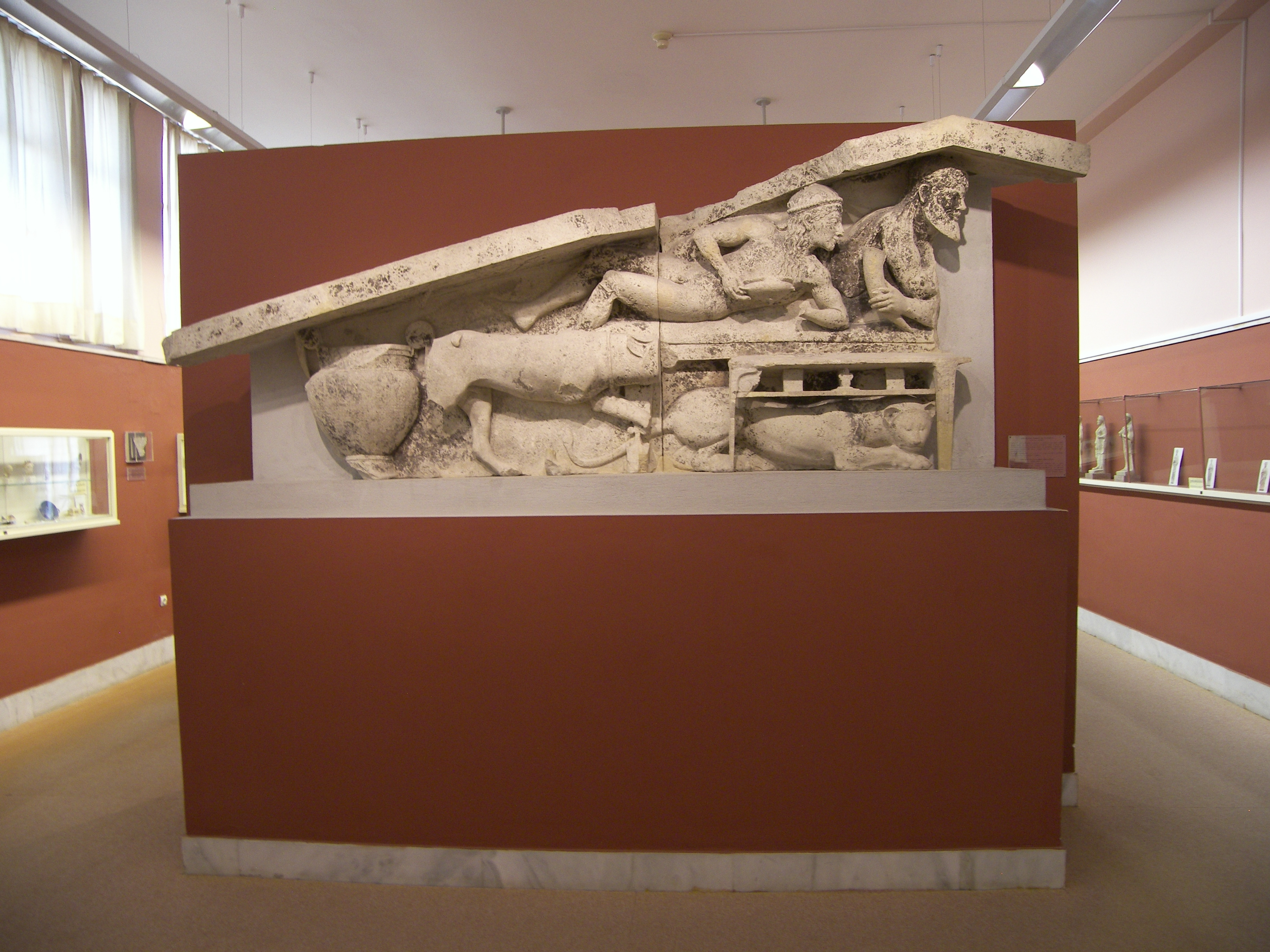
A relief of Dionysus Bacchus at the Archaeological Museum of Corfu. Pediment with Dionysos at the Corfu Museum. The left part of an Archaic pediment from the area of Figareto depicts a Dionysiac symposium and is dated to 500 BC.

== Persian War ==
During the Persian War of 480 BC, Greek envoys were sent to Corcyra requesting aid. Corcyra enthusiastically promised ships and fitted out 60 of them, but they failed to arrive in time for the Battle of Salamis. Herodotus describes the delay as a strategic choice by the Corcyraeans to remain neutral. The excuse given for failing to join the battle was unfavorable winds, but Herodotus says that had the Persians been victorious, the Corcyraeans would have claimed to have deliberately avoided the battle to gain favour from the invading Persians.

== Peloponnesian War ==
Writing between 431 and 395 BC, Thucydides credited Corcyra's conflict with Corinth over their joint city Epidamnus as a significant cause of the Peloponnesian War. Corcyra, otherwise neutral as far as the two major powers (the Delian League and the Peloponnesian League) were concerned, appealed to Athens, the head of the Delian League, for assistance against Corinth, which belonged to the Peloponnesian League.

In 427 BC, during the Peloponnesian War, there was a revolution and civil war in Corcyra between the democrats, who wished to remain in an alliance with Athens, and the aristocrats, who claimed that they were being enslaved to Athens and wished to form an alliance with Corinth and Lacedaemon. After a period of violent skirmishes, the democrats won with assistance from the Athenian navy and subsequently slaughtered those they suspected of being an enemy, while the rest of their foes fled to the Greek mainland.

== 4th century BC ==
Around 375 BC, a Peloponnesian fleet, under the command of Mnasippus, attacked Corcyra. After the siege, the resident Corcyraeans (who were suffering from hunger) deserted and were sold as slaves or put to death later by Mnasippus.

== Hellenistic Period ==
During the Hellenistic Period, Corcyra changed hands several times. In 303 BC, after a vain siege by Cassander of Macedon, the island was occupied for a short time by Cleonymus of Sparta and then regained its independence. Three years later, Cassander besieged it again, but his fleet was destroyed by an intervention of the tyrant Agathocles of Syracuse. Agathocles added the island to his own domains and in 295 BC offered it as a dowry for his daughter Lanassa on her marriage to Pyrrhus of Epirus. When Lanassa left Pyrrhus in 291 BC, she tried to transfer Corcyra to her next husband, King Demetrius Poliorcetes of Macedon, but in 274 BC, Pyrrhus's son Ptolemy recovered Corcyra for his father.

Corcyra remained a member of the Epirote League until 255 BC, when it regained independence after the death of Alexander II, last King of Epirus. In 229 BC, after a Greek defeat in the naval Battle of Paxos, the city was briefly occupied by Illyrians under the command of Demetrius of Pharos. Polybius described the incident:

"When the season for sailing had come, [Queen] Teuta sent out a larger fleet of [piratical] galleys than ever against the Greek shores, some of which sailed straight for Corcyra... [Another part of the fleet that had sailed for Epidamnos and was repulsed also went] there, to the terror of the inhabitants, they disembarked and set about besieging the town... the Corcyreans... sent off envoys to the Achaean and Aetolian leagues, begging for instant help... ten decked ships of war belonging to the Achaeans were manned... fitted out in a few days, set sail for Corcyra in hopes of raising the siege. [However,] ...the Illyrians obtained a reinforcement of seven decked ships from the Acarnanians" engaging off the island of Paxi. They bested the Achaeans, capturing four ships and sinking one; the remaining five ran back home... The Illyrians, on the other hand, filled with self-confidence by their success, continued their siege of [Corcyra] in high spirits... while the Corcyreans, reduced to the despair of their safety by what had happened, after sustaining the siege for a short time longer, made terms with the Illyrians, consenting to receive a garrison, and with it Demetrius of Pharos."

The Roman Republic, already engaged in the First Illyrian War, sent consul Gnaeus Fulvius Centumalus with 200 ships to Corcyra. Demetrius, who had quarreled with the Illyrians, surrendered to the Romans, and Corcyra became a Roman protectorate, de facto ending its independence. Around 189 BC it was governed by a Roman prefect, presumably nominated by the consuls, and in 148 BC, it was attached to the province of Macedonia.

== See also ==
- List of ancient Greek cities
- List of cities in ancient Epirus
