= Pseudoperipteros =

Type of antique temple

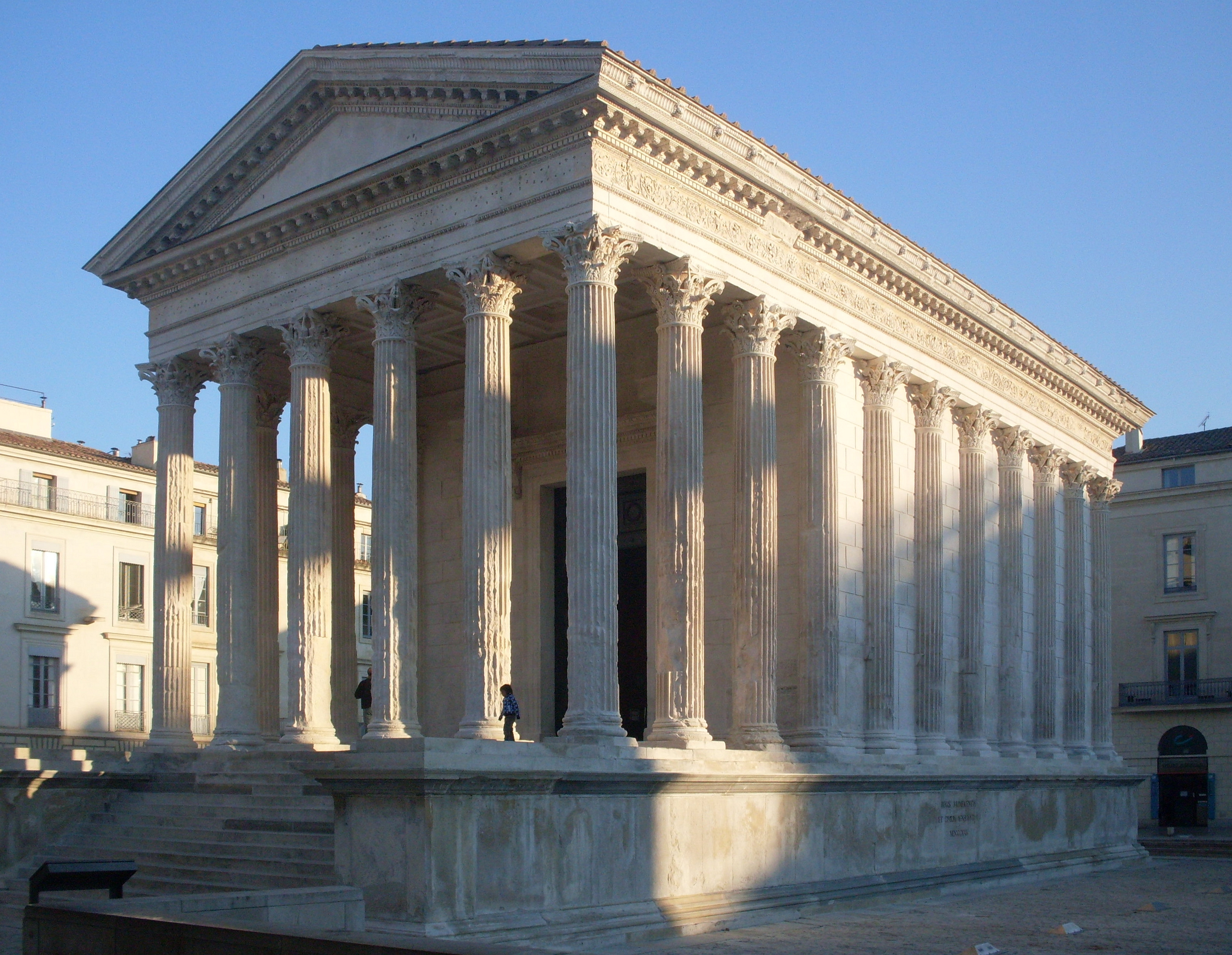
The Maison Carrée at Nîmes, a hexastyle pseudoperipteral Roman temple

A pseudoperipteros (Greek: ψευδοπερίπτερος, meaning "falsely peripteral") is a building with engaged columns embedded in the outer walls, except the front of the building. The form is found in classical architecture in ancient Greek temples, especially in the Hellenistic period. In Roman temples, the pseudoperipteral form became usual, where there were columns behind the portico as well. Typically the front has a portico with free-standing columns, but columns on the other three sides of the walls are engaged.

If free-standing columns surround the entire building, it is a peripteros. Unlike a peripteros, a pseudoperipteros has no space (peristasis) between the cella (naos, inner chamber) and the outer walls on the sides and rear, so the engaged columns can also be considered to be embedded directly into those walls of the cella.

The Temple of Olympian Zeus at Agrigento was a famous Greek example of this style. Its facade also has engaged columns.

A pseudoperipteral building with a portico at each end is an amphiprostyle. Examples include the small Temple of Athena Nike and Federal Hall.

== Sources ==
- "Pseudoperipteral". Merriam-Webster.com Dictionary. Merriam-Webster. OCLC 1032680871.
- Ten Books on Architecture by Vitruvius Pollio
