= Portico =

Type of porch

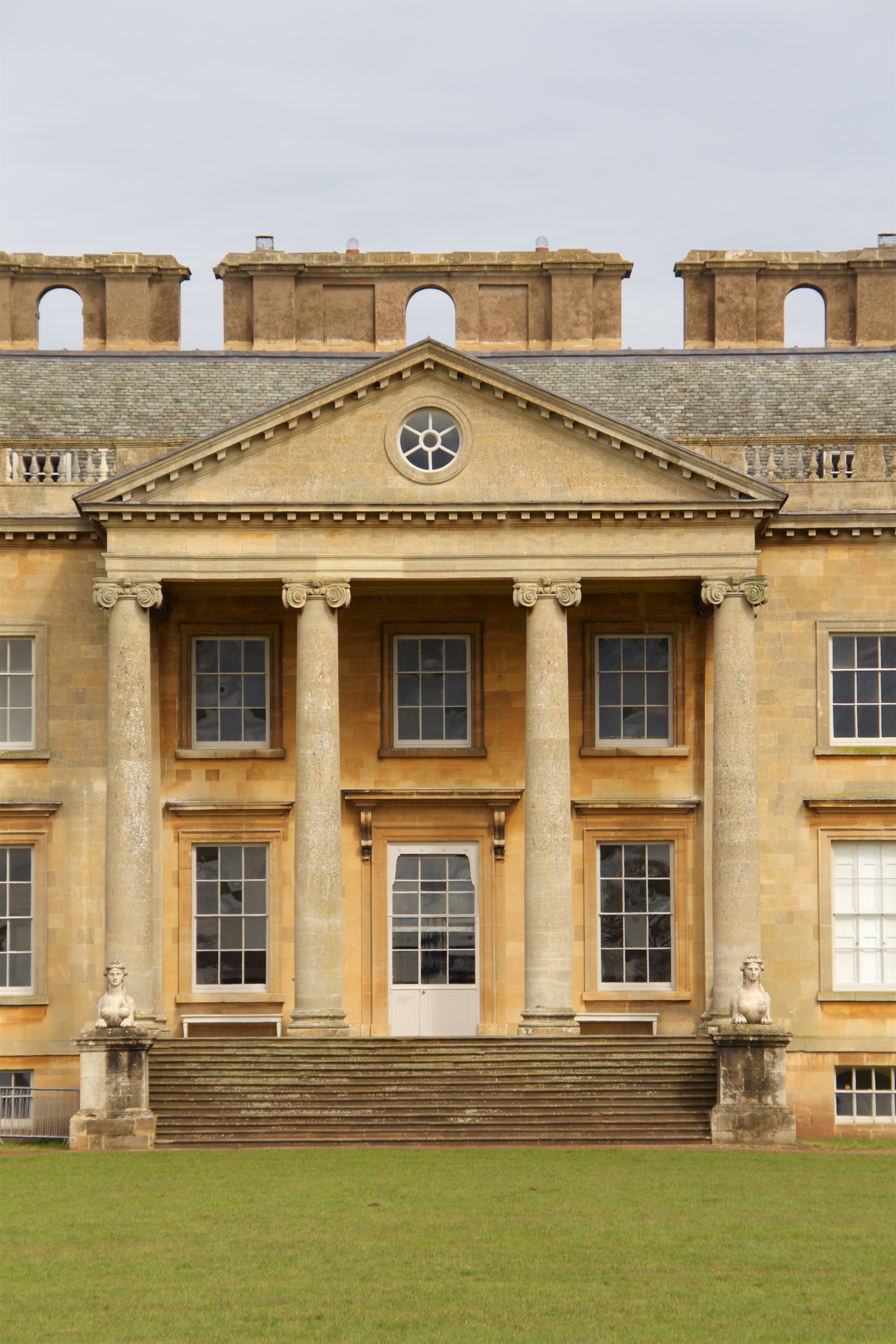
The portico of Croome Court in Croome D'Abitot (England)

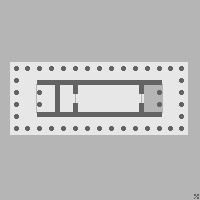
Temple diagram with location of the pronaos highlighted

A portico is a porch leading to the entrance of a building, or extended as a colonnade, with a roof structure over a walkway, supported by columns or enclosed by walls. This idea was widely used in ancient Greece and has influenced many cultures, including most Western cultures.

Porticos are sometimes topped with pediments. Palladio was a pioneer of using temple-fronts for secular buildings. In the UK, the temple-front applied to The Vyne, Hampshire, was the first portico applied to an English country house.

A pronaos (UK: /proʊˈneɪ.ɒs/ or US: /proʊˈneɪ.əs/) is the inner area of the portico of a Greek or Roman temple, situated between the portico's colonnade or walls and the entrance to the cella, or shrine. Roman temples commonly had an open pronaos, usually with only columns and no walls, and the pronaos could be as long as the cella. The word pronaos (πρόναος) is Greek for "before a temple". In Latin, a pronaos is also referred to as an anticum or prodomus. The pronaos of a Greek and Roman temple is typically topped with a pediment.

== Types ==
The different variants of porticos are named by the number of columns they have. The "style" suffix comes from the Greek στῦλος, "column". In Greek and Roman architecture, the pronaos of a temple is typically topped with a pediment.

=== Tetrastyle ===
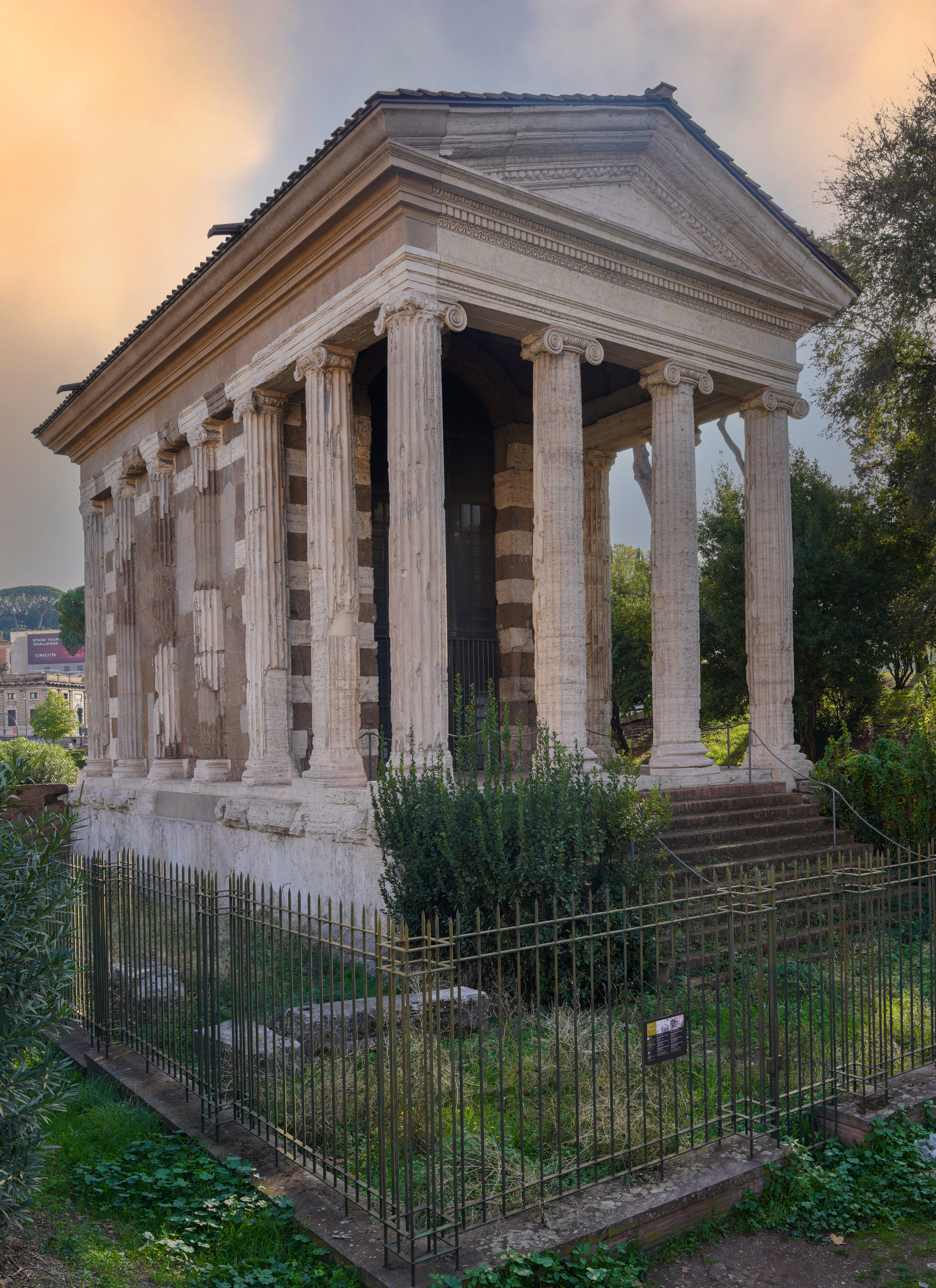
Temple of Portunus in Rome, with its tetrastyle portico of four Ionic columns

The tetrastyle has four columns; it was commonly employed by the Greeks and the Etruscans for small structures such as public buildings and amphiprostyles.

The Romans favoured the four columned portico for their pseudoperipteral temples like the Temple of Portunus, and for amphiprostyle temples such as the Temple of Venus and Roma, and for the prostyle entrance porticos of large public buildings like the Basilica of Maxentius and Constantine. Roman provincial capitals also manifested tetrastyle construction, such as the Capitoline Temple in Volubilis.

The North Portico of the White House is perhaps the most notable four-columned portico in the United States.

=== Hexastyle ===
Hexastyle buildings had six columns and were the standard façade in canonical Greek Doric architecture between the archaic period 600–550 BCE up to the Age of Pericles 450–430 BCE.

==== Greek hexastyle ====
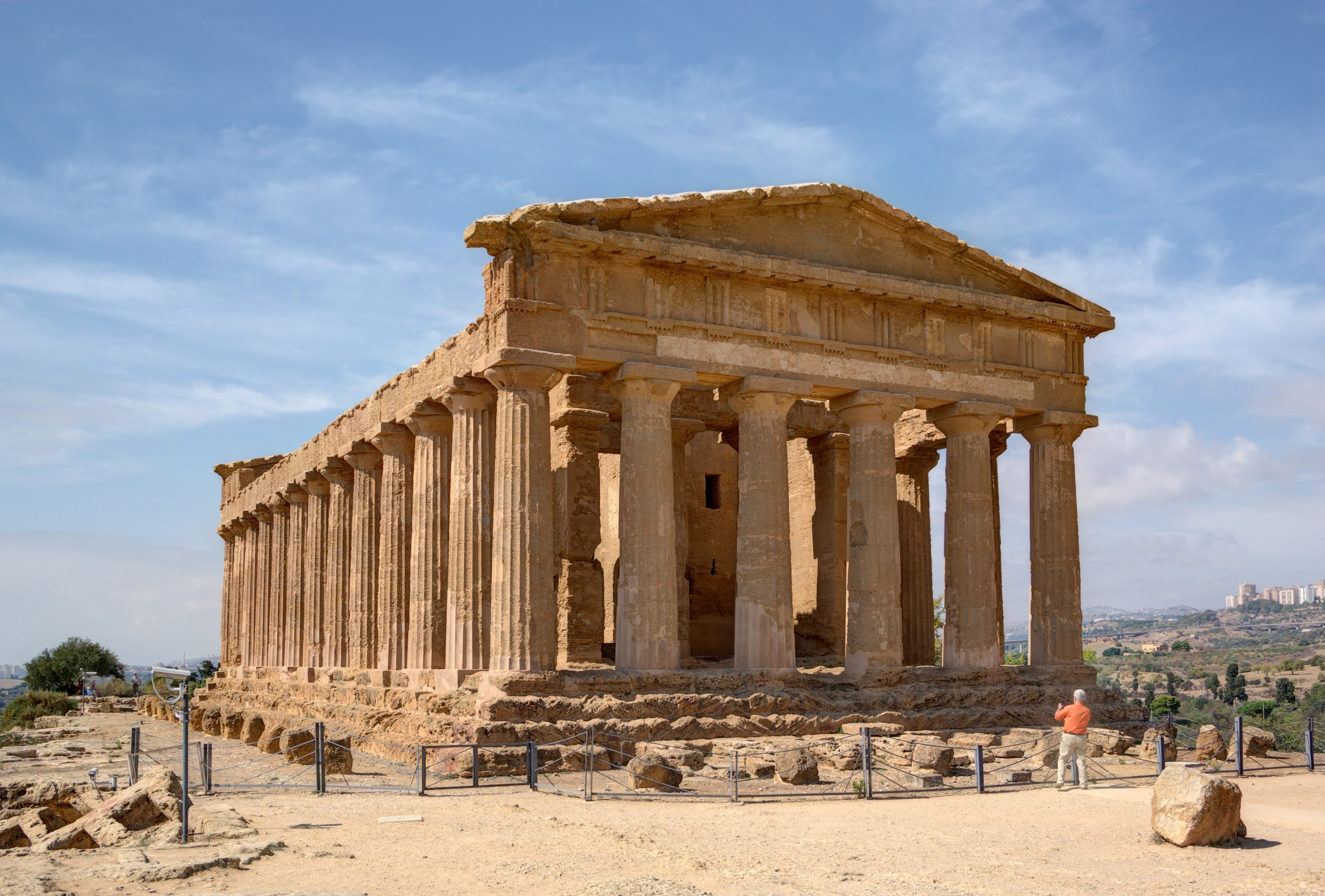
The hexastyle Temple of Concord at Agrigentum (c. 430 BCE)

Some well-known examples of classical Doric hexastyle Greek temples:

- The group at Paestum comprising the Temple of Hera (c. 550 BCE), the Temple of Apollo (c. 450 BCE), the first Temple of Athena ("Basilica") (c. 500 BCE) and the second Temple of Hera (460–440 BCE)
- The Temple of Aphaea at Aegina c. 495 BCE
- Temple E at Selinus (465–450 BCE) dedicated to Hera
- The Temple of Zeus at Olympia, now a ruin
- Temple F or the so-called "Temple of Concordia" at Agrigentum (c. 430 BCE), one of the best-preserved classical Greek temples, retaining almost all of its peristyle and entablature
- The "unfinished temple" at Segesta (c. 430 BCE)
- The Temple of Hephaestus below the Acropolis at Athens, long known as the "Theseum" (449–444 BCE), also one of the most intact Greek temples surviving from antiquity
- The Temple of Poseidon on Cape Sunium (c. 449 BCE)

Hexastyle was also applied to Ionic temples, such as the prostyle porch of the sanctuary of Athena on the Erechtheum, at the Acropolis of Athens.

==== Roman hexastyle ====
With the colonization by the Greeks of Southern Italy, hexastyle was adopted by the Etruscans and subsequently acquired by the ancient Romans. Roman taste favoured narrow pseudoperipteral and amphiprostyle buildings with tall columns, raised on podiums for the added pomp and grandeur conferred by considerable height. The Maison Carrée at Nîmes, France, is the best-preserved Roman hexastyle temple surviving from antiquity.

=== Octastyle ===
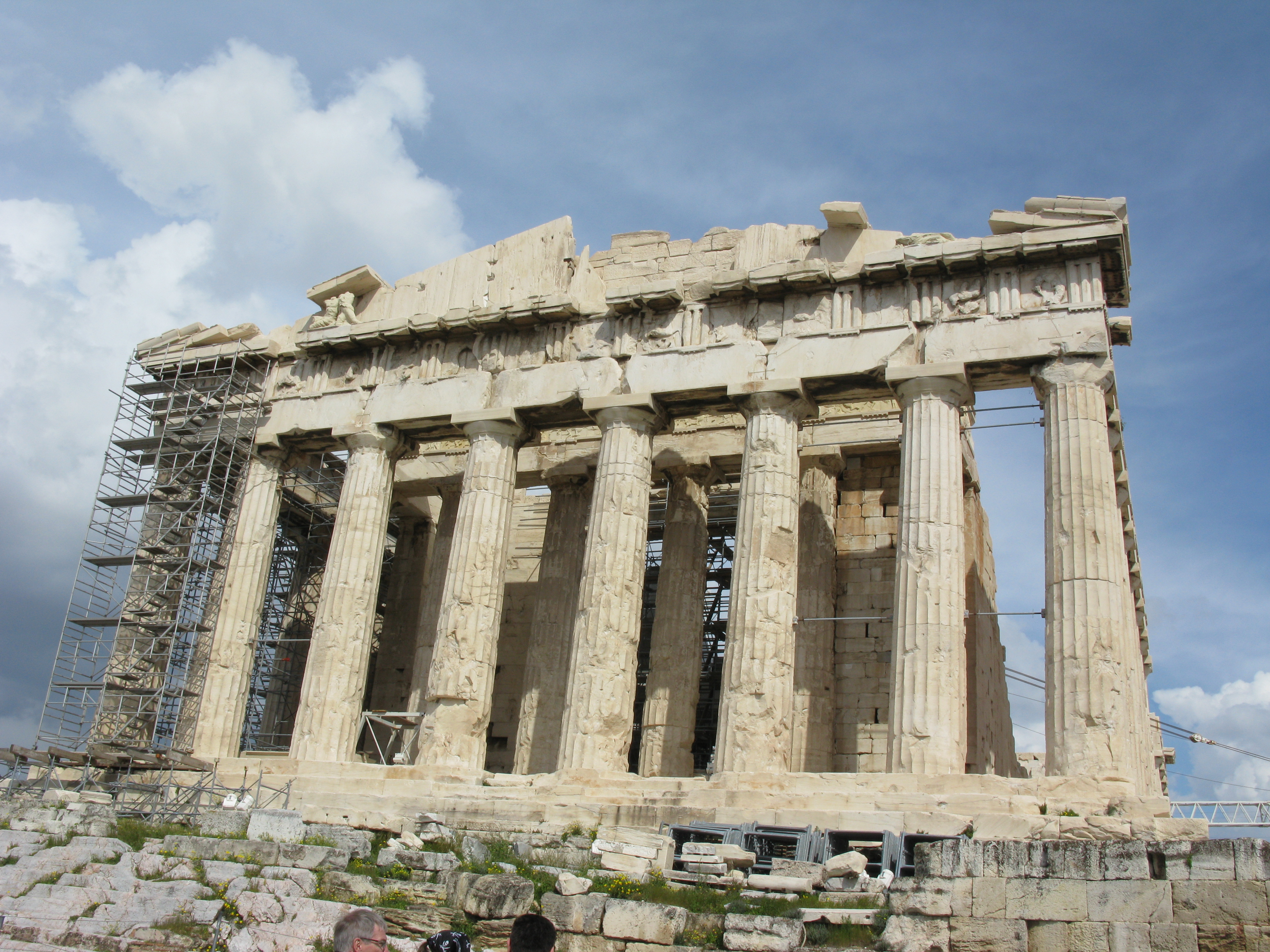
The western side of the octastyle Parthenon in Athens

Octastyle buildings had eight columns; they were considerably rarer than the hexastyle ones in the classical Greek architectural canon. The best-known octastyle buildings surviving from antiquity are the Parthenon in Athens, built during the Age of Pericles (450–430 BCE), and the Pantheon in Rome (125 CE). The destroyed Temple of Divus Augustus in Rome, the centre of the Augustan cult, is shown on Roman coins of the 2nd century CE as having been built in octastyle.

=== Decastyle ===
The decastyle has ten columns; as in the temple of Apollo Didymaeus at Miletus, and the portico of University College London.

The best-known Roman decastyle portico is on the Temple of Venus and Roma, built by Hadrian in about 130 CE. Another well-known example is on the Temple of Jupiter at Baalbek, built in about 1st century CE.

== Gallery ==
Short visual history of porticos

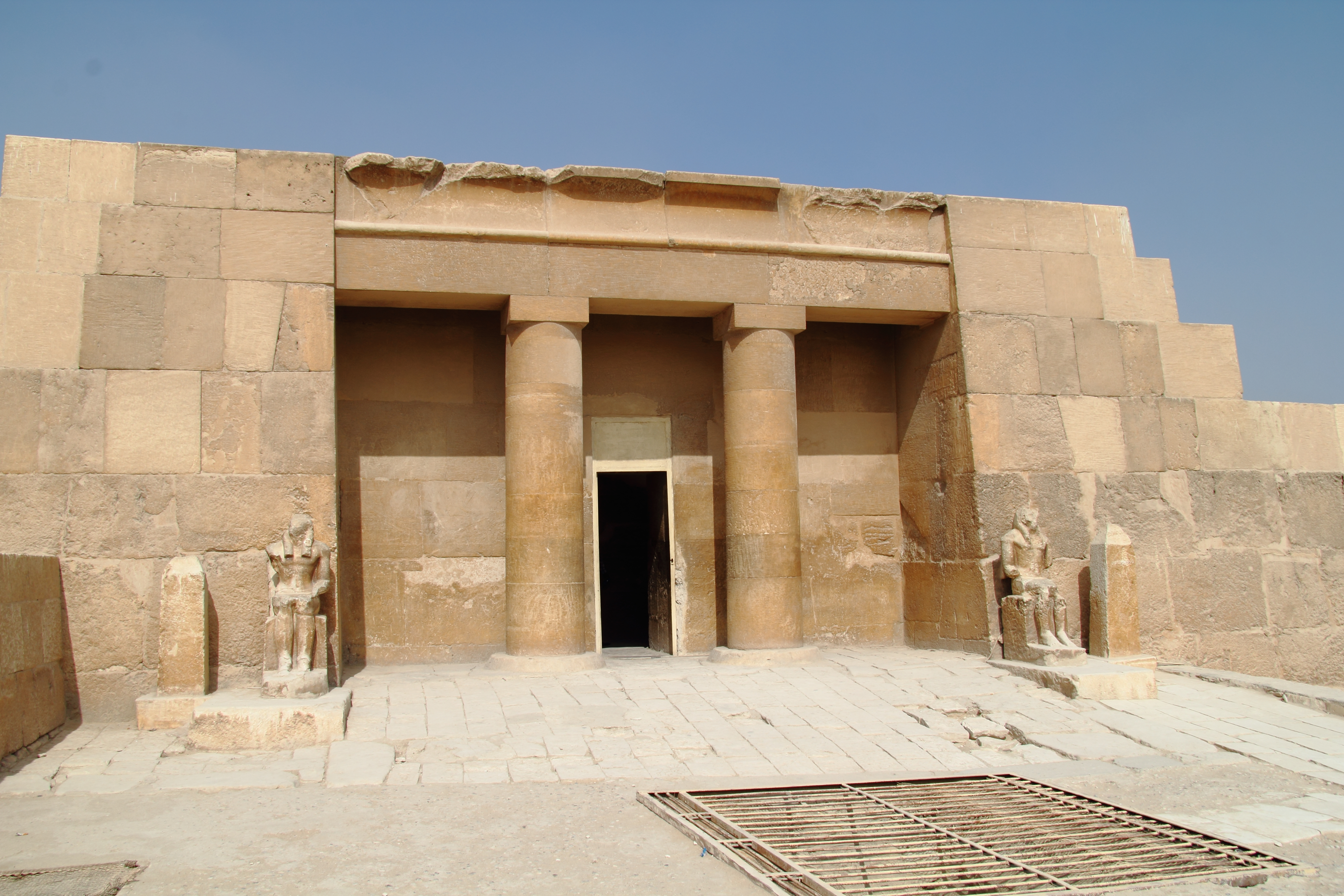
Ancient Egyptian portico of the Mastaba of Seshemnefer IV (Giza pyramid complex, Egypt)

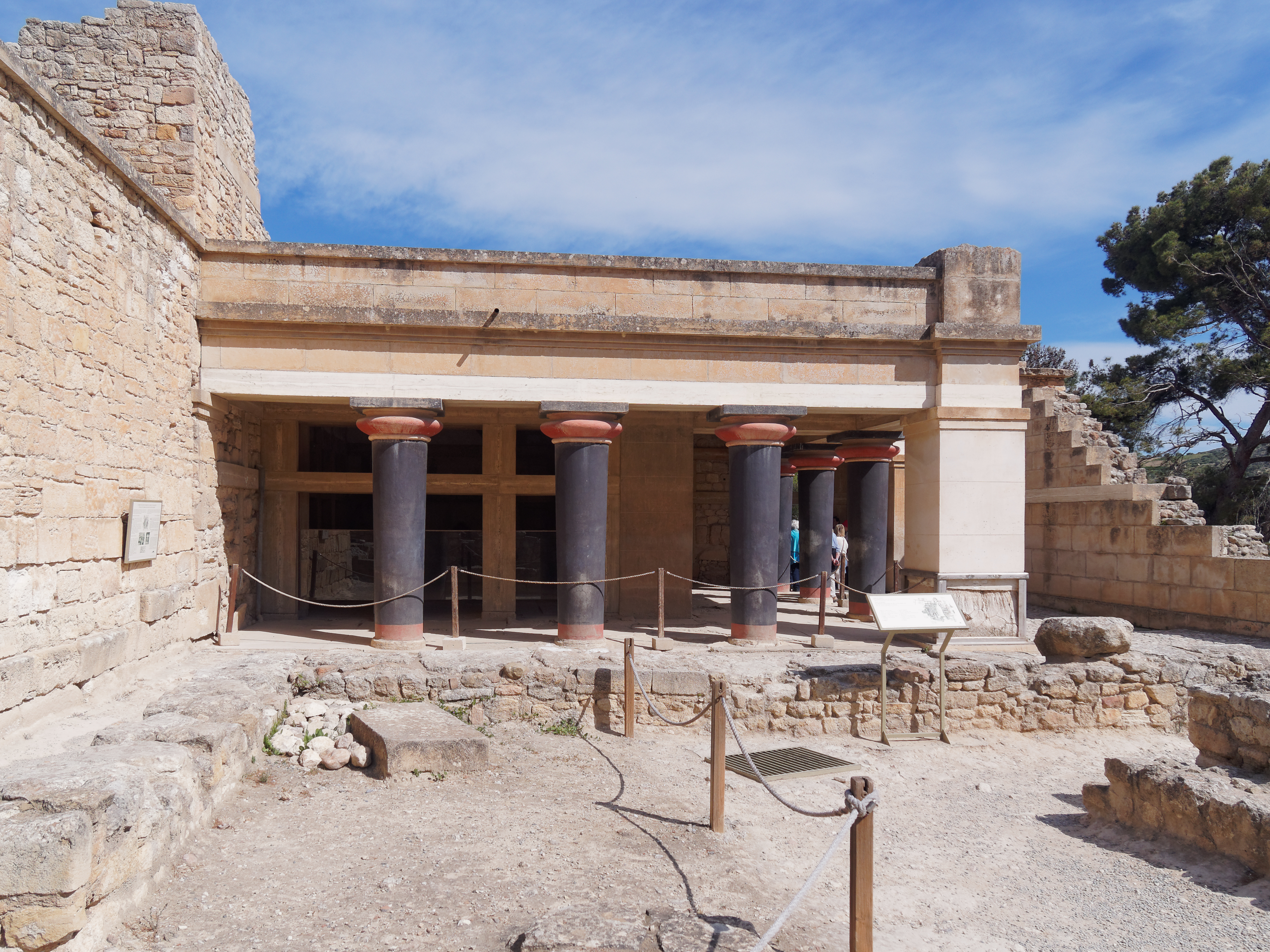
Minoan portico of the Knossos Palace (Crete, Greece)

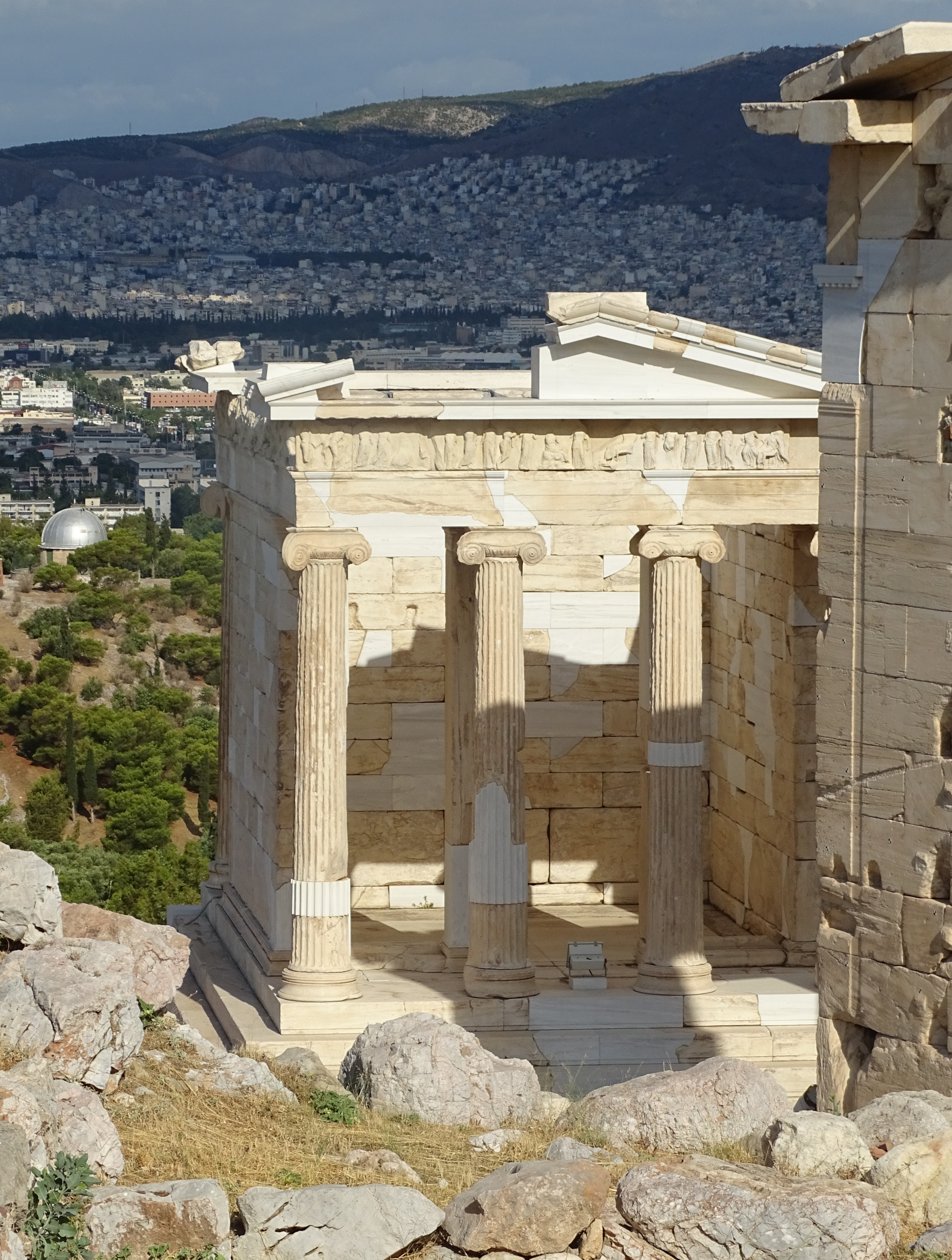
Ancient Greek portico with Ionic columns of the Temple of Athena Nike (Athens, Greece)

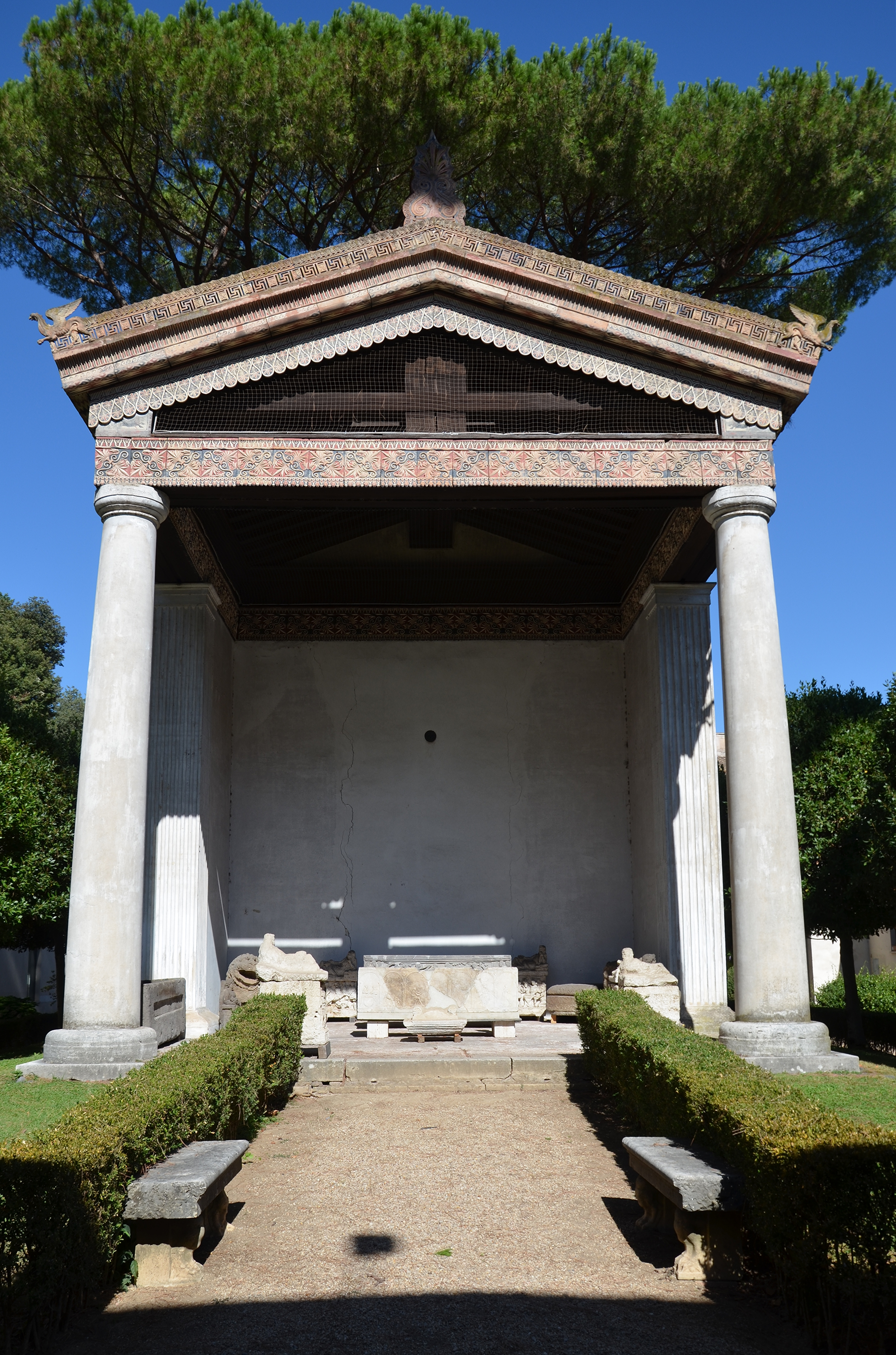
Etruscan portico of a temple model (now in National Etruscan Museum of Villa Giulia, Rome)

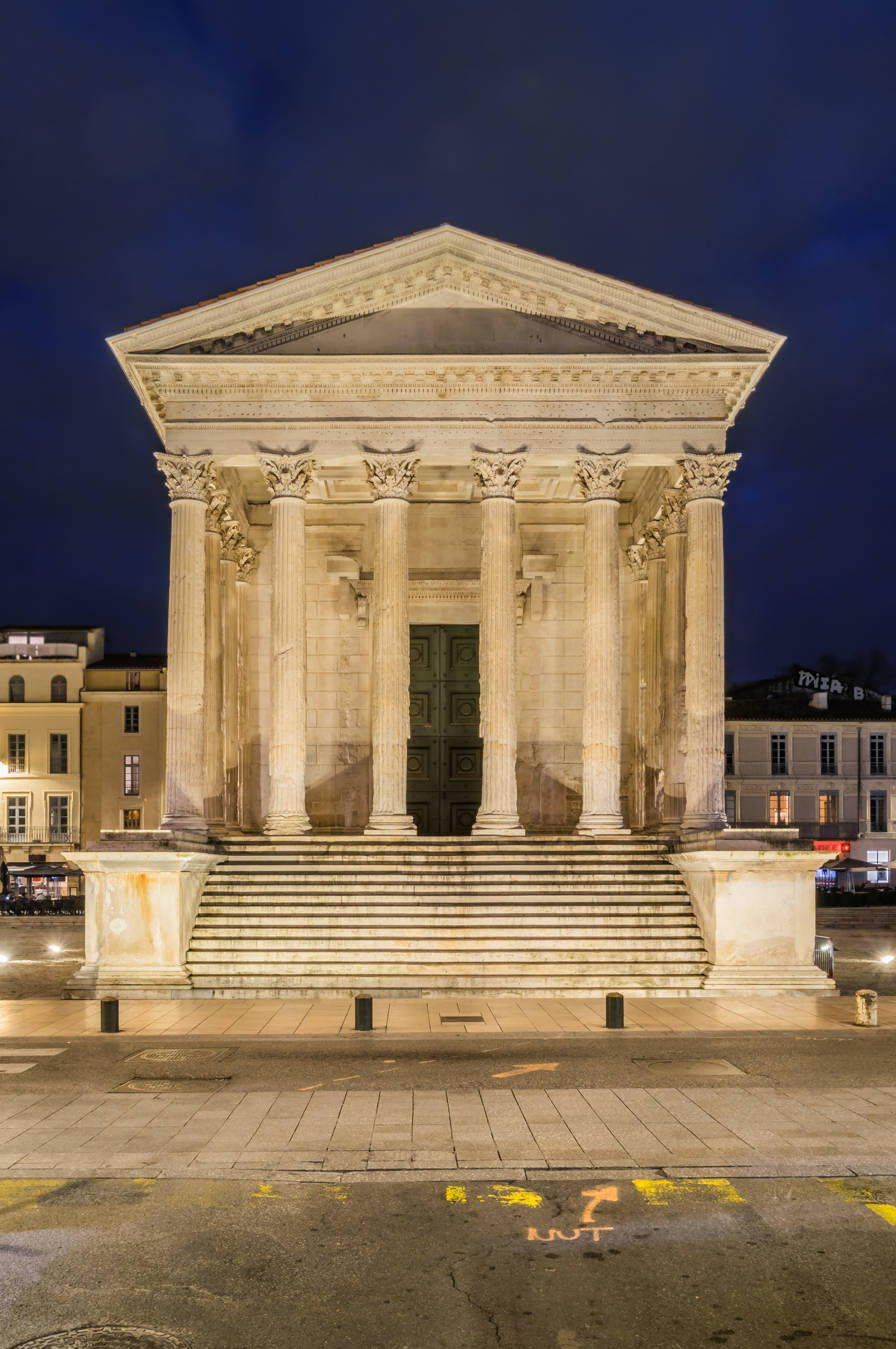
Ancient Roman portico of the Maison Carrée (Nîmes, France)

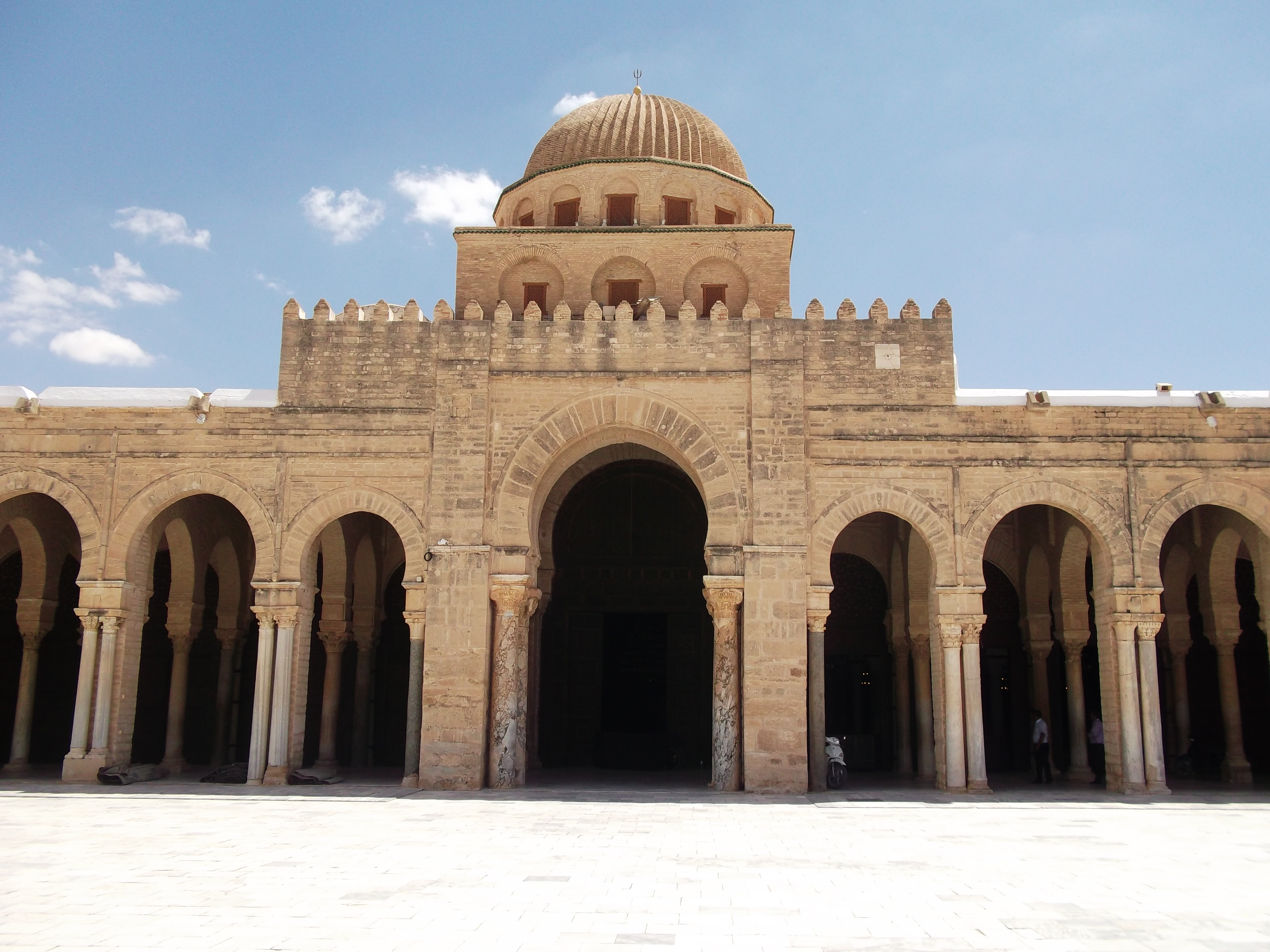
Islamic portico of the Great Mosque of Kairouan (Kairouan, Tunisia)

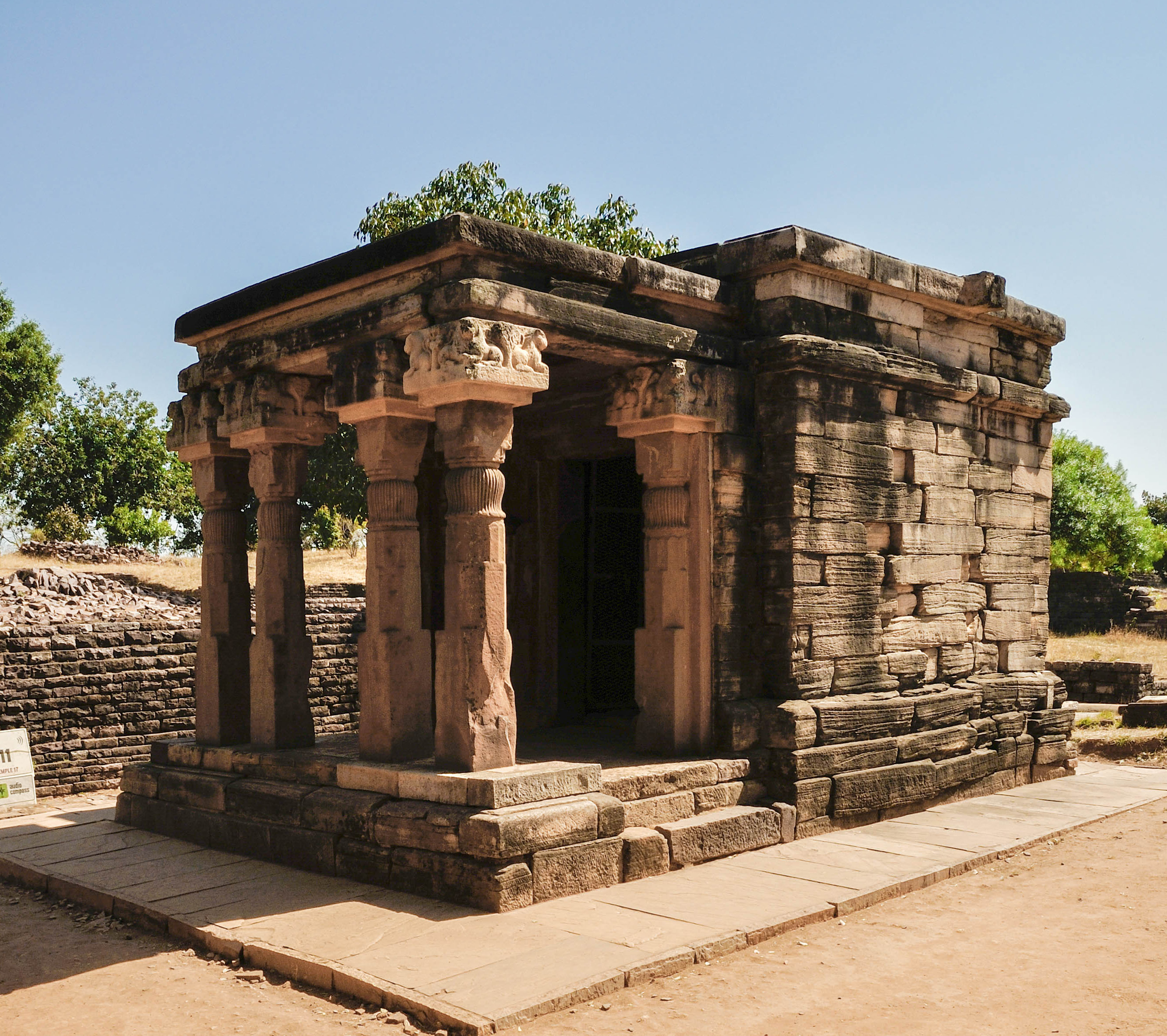
Indian portico of the Sanchi Temple 17 (Sanchi, India)

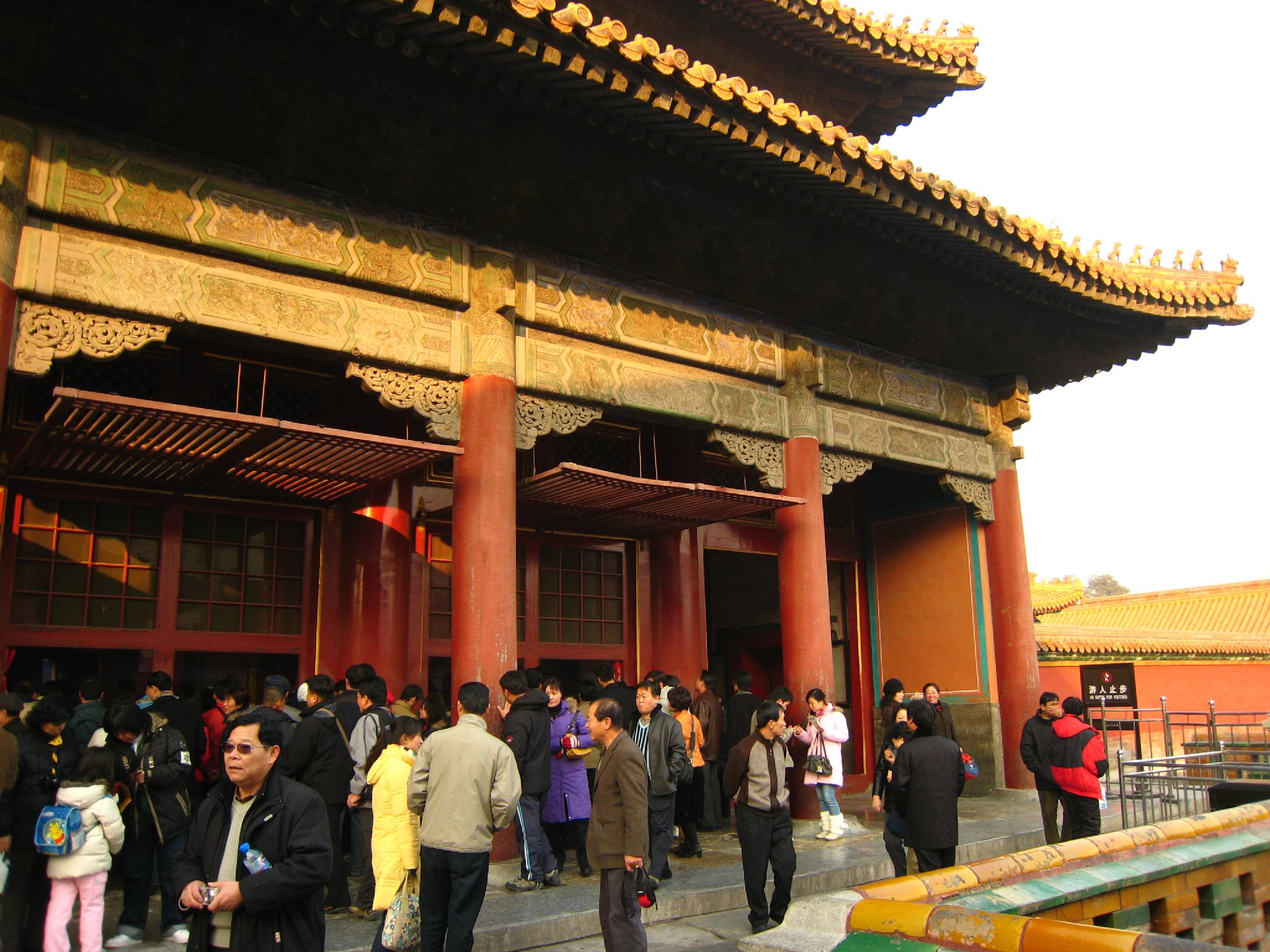
Chinese portico of the Forbidden City (Beijing, China)

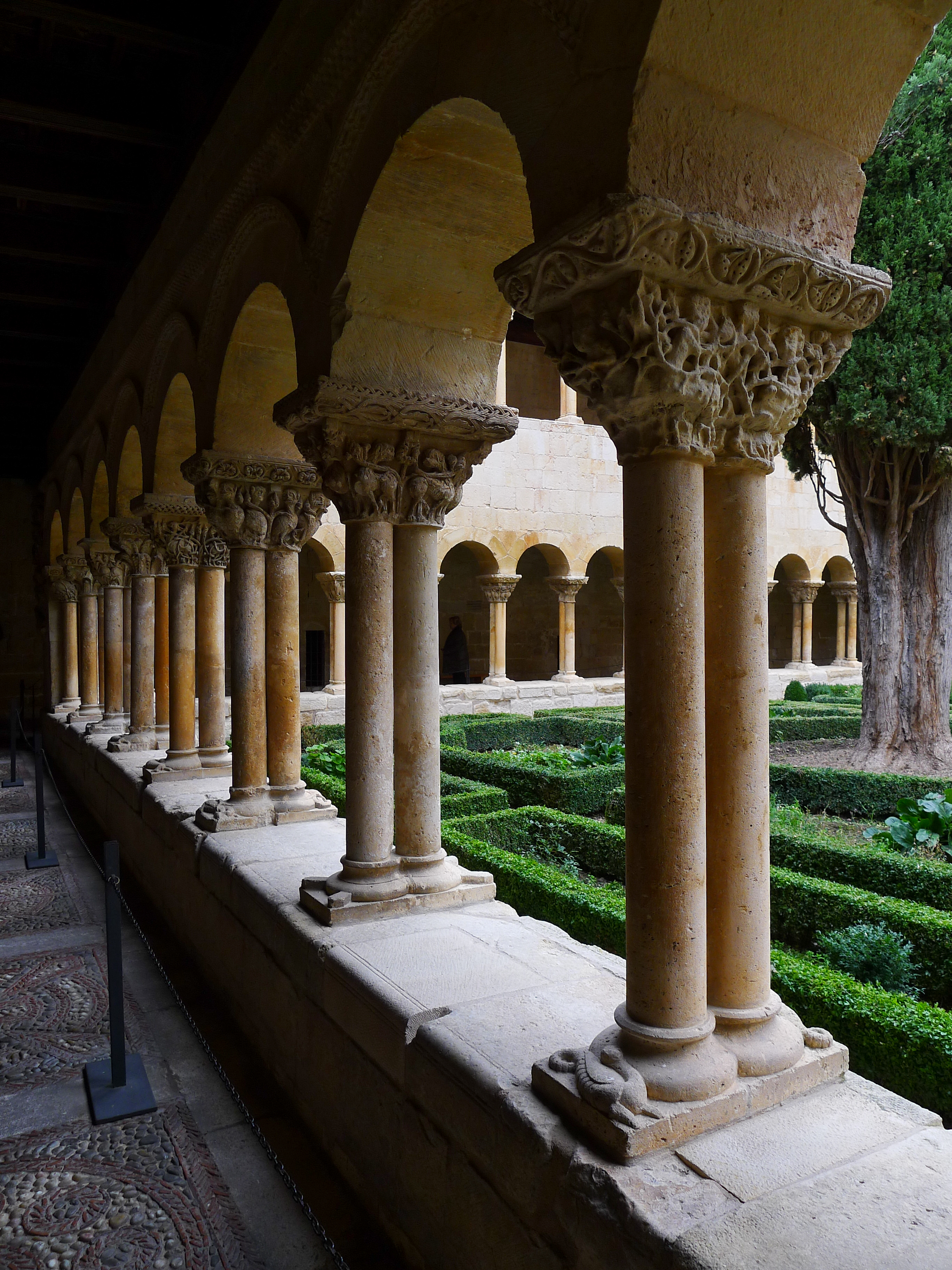
Romanesque portico of the Abbey of Santo Domingo de Silos (Santo Domingo de Silos, Spain)

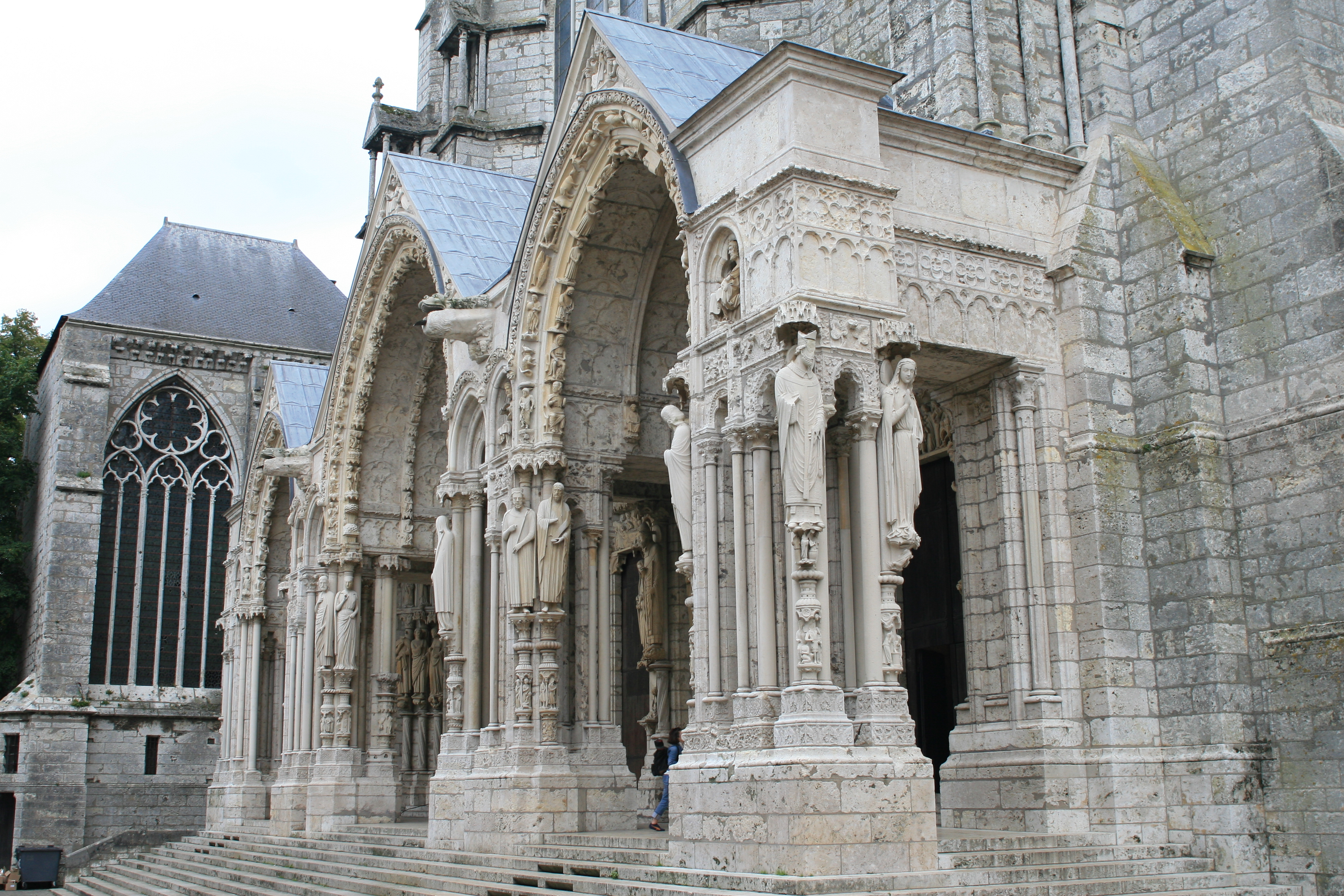
Gothic portico of the Chartres Cathedral (Chartres, France)

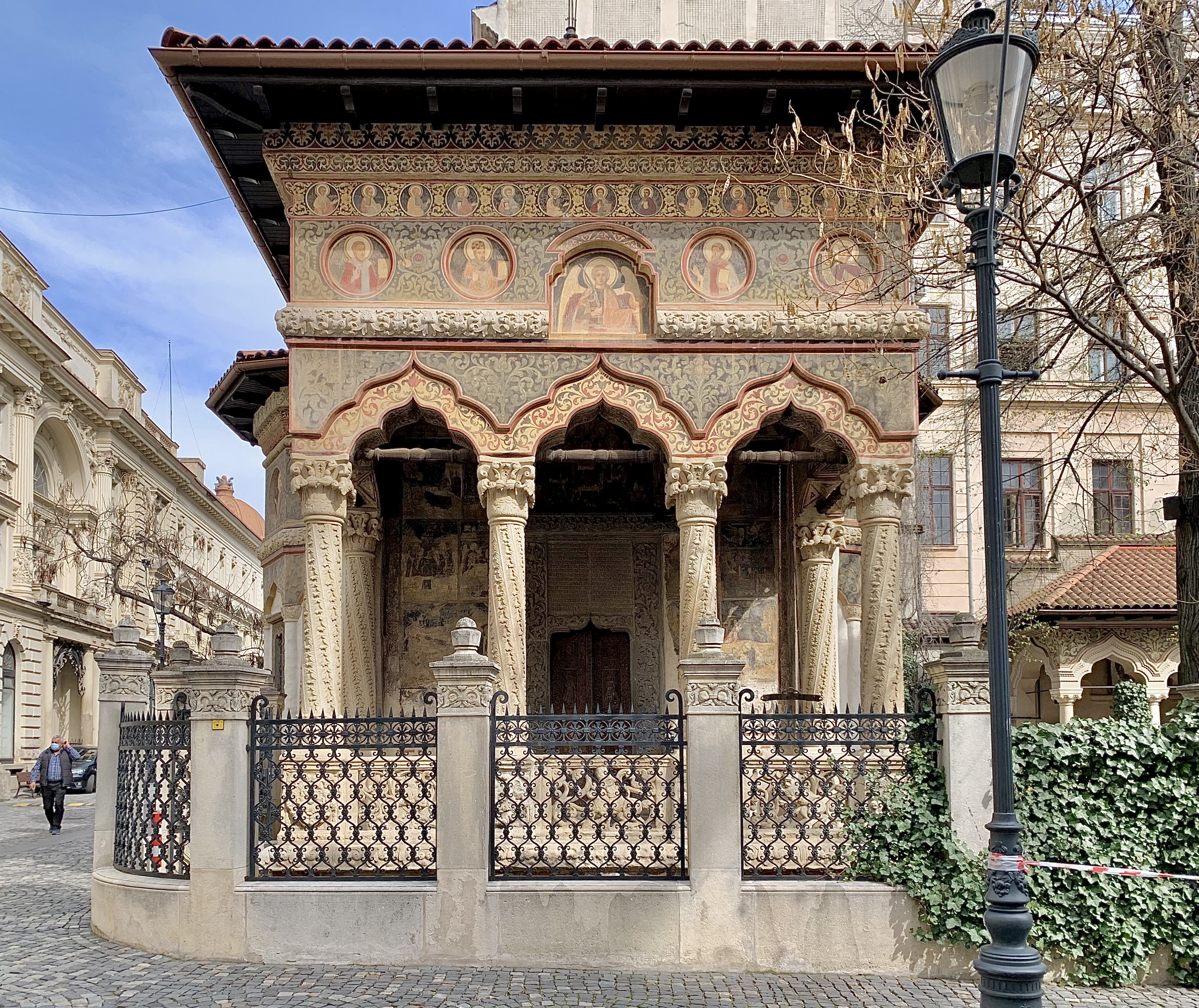
Brâncovenesc portico of the Stavropoleos Church (Bucharest, Romania)

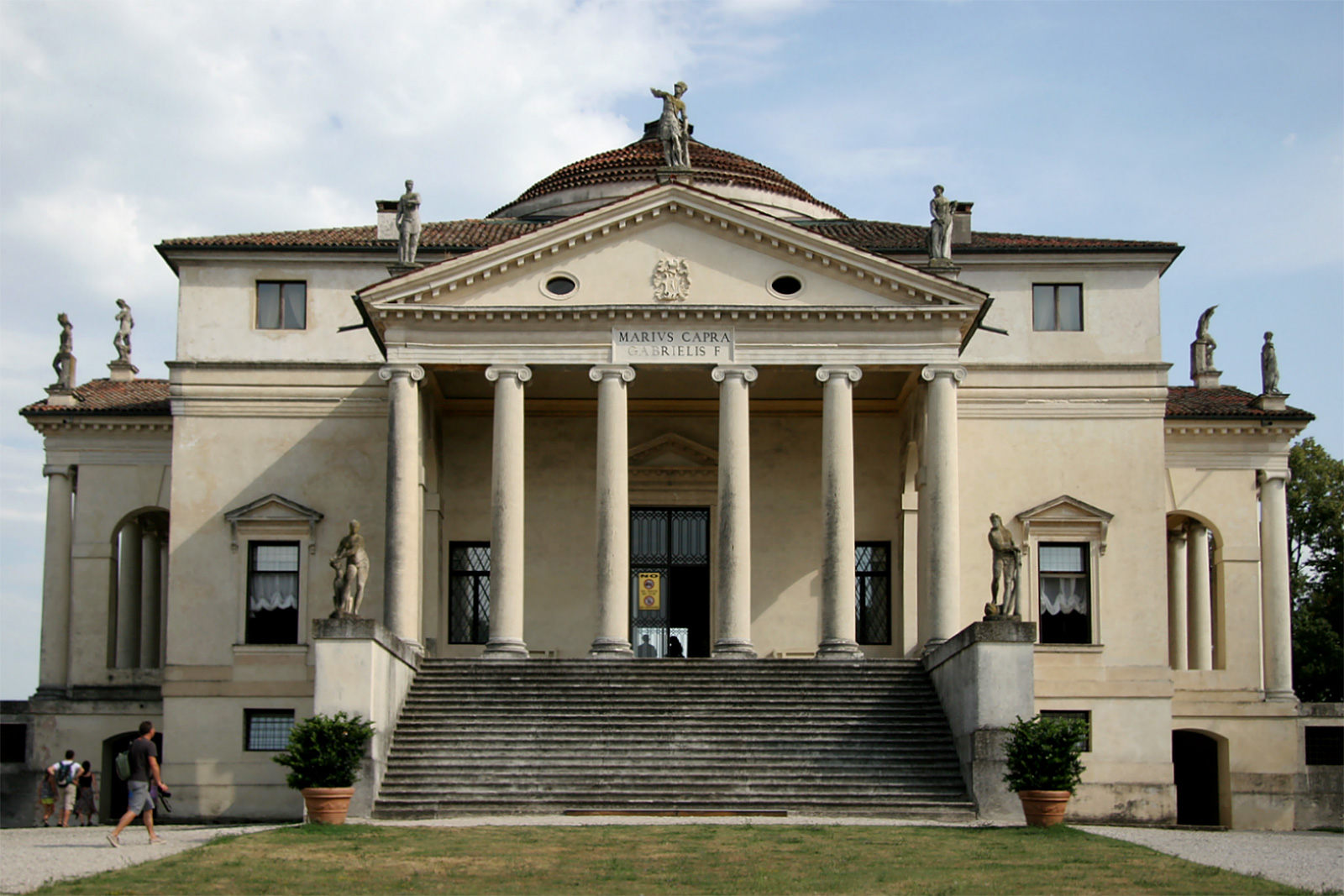
Renaissance portico of the Villa Capra "La Rotonda" (Vicenza, Veneto, Italy)

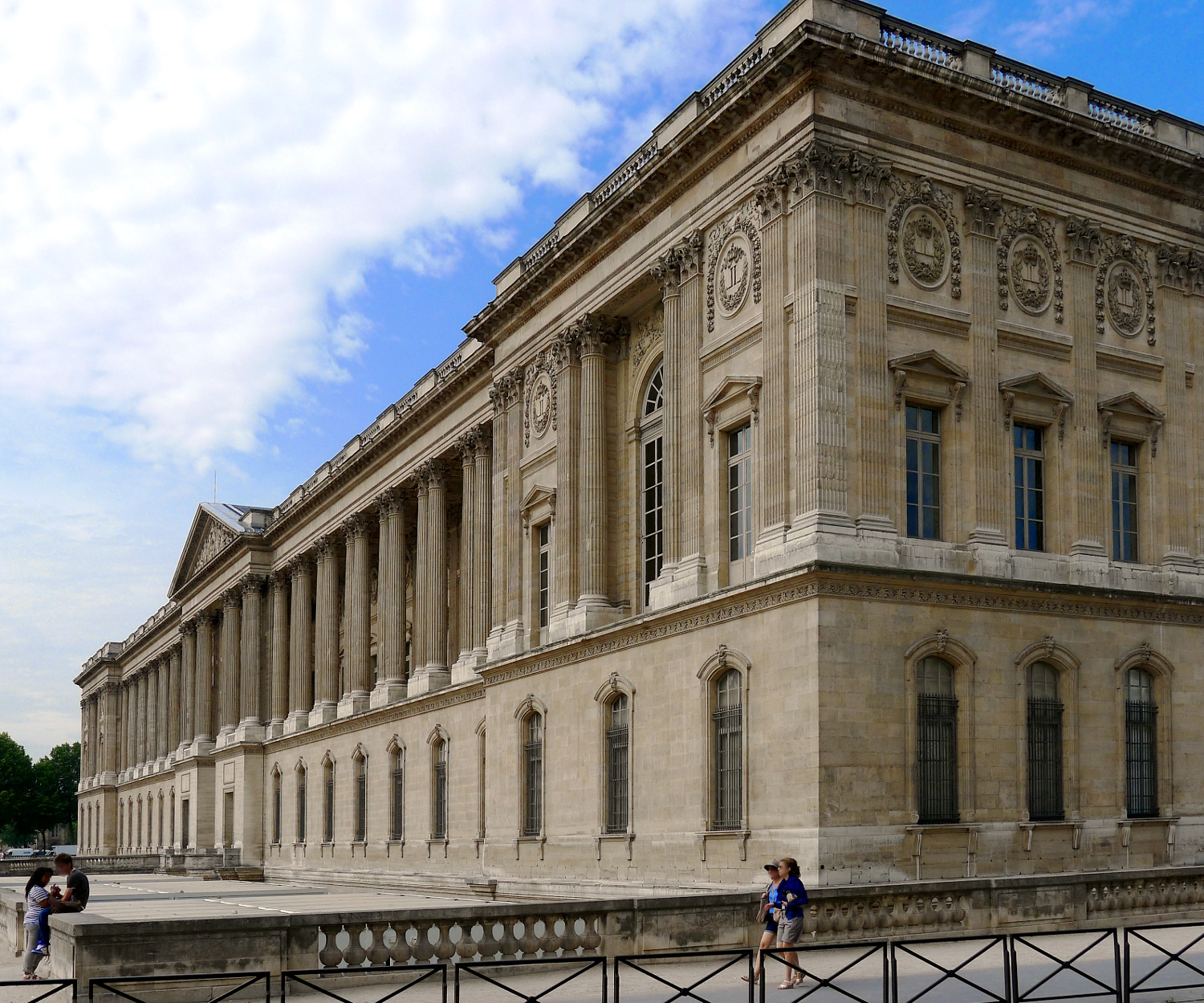
Baroque porticos of the Louvre Colonnade (Paris)

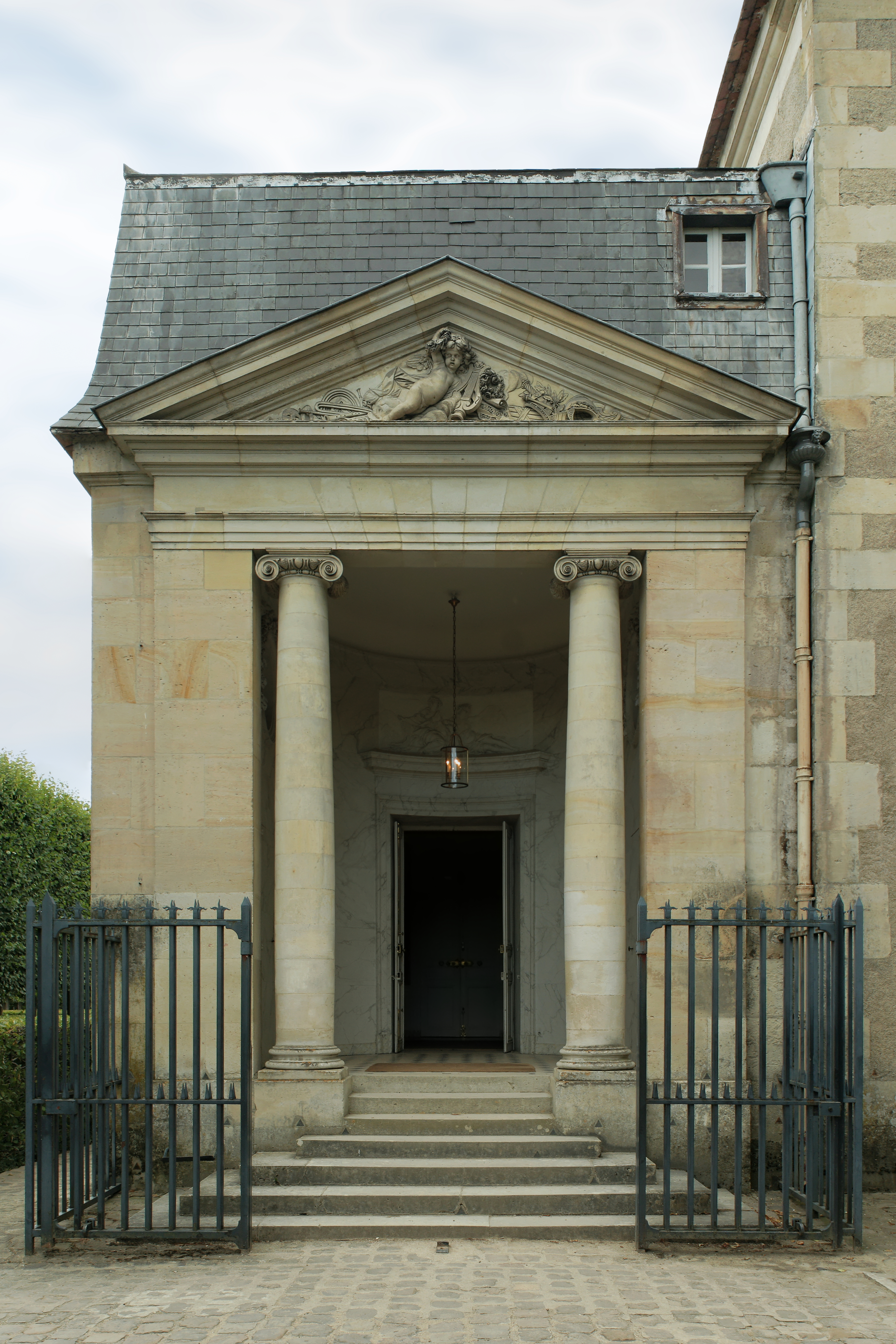
Louis XVI portico of the Théâtre de la reine, part of the Petit Trianon (France)

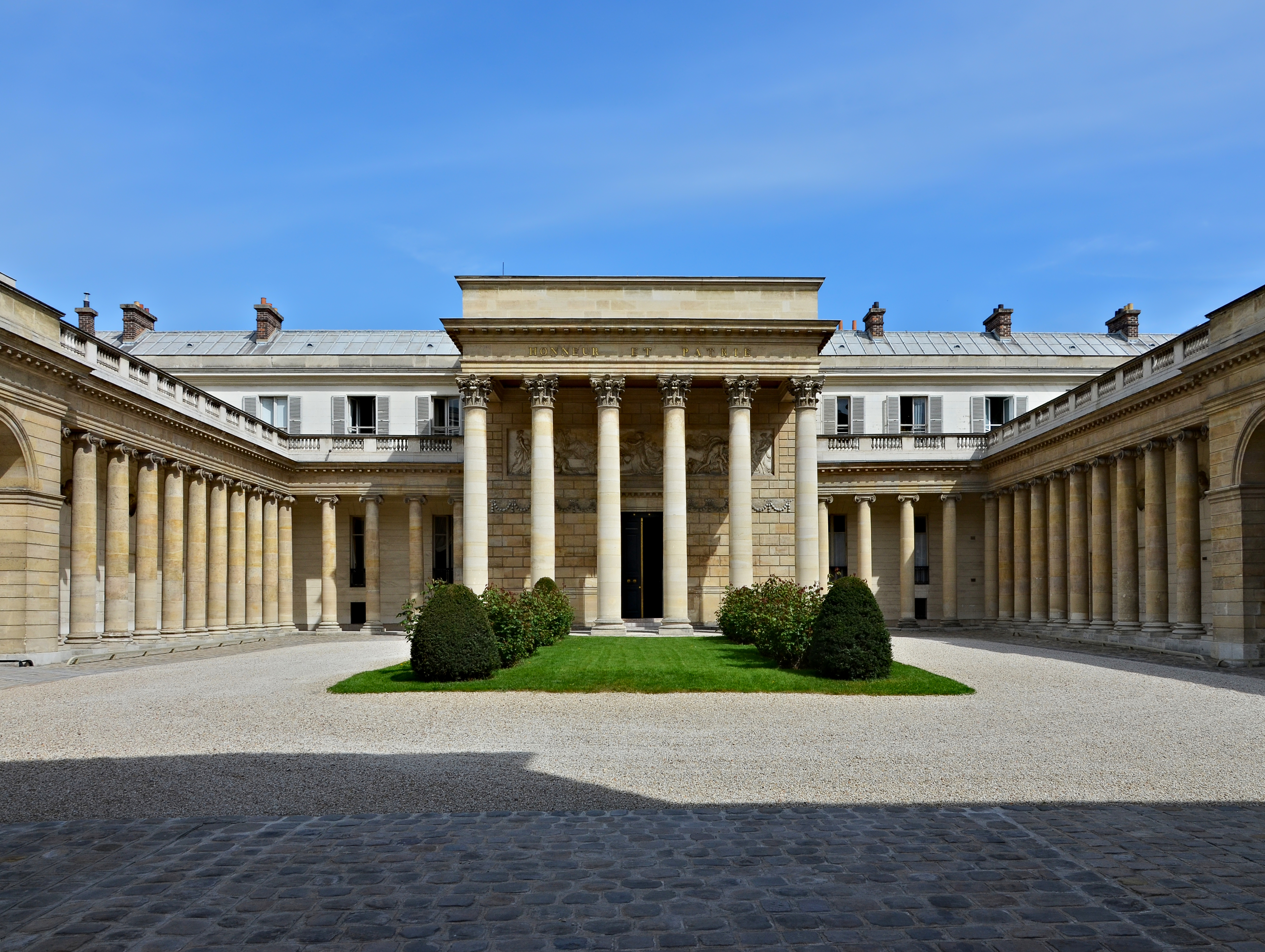
Neoclassical portico of the Palais de la Légion d'Honneur (Paris)

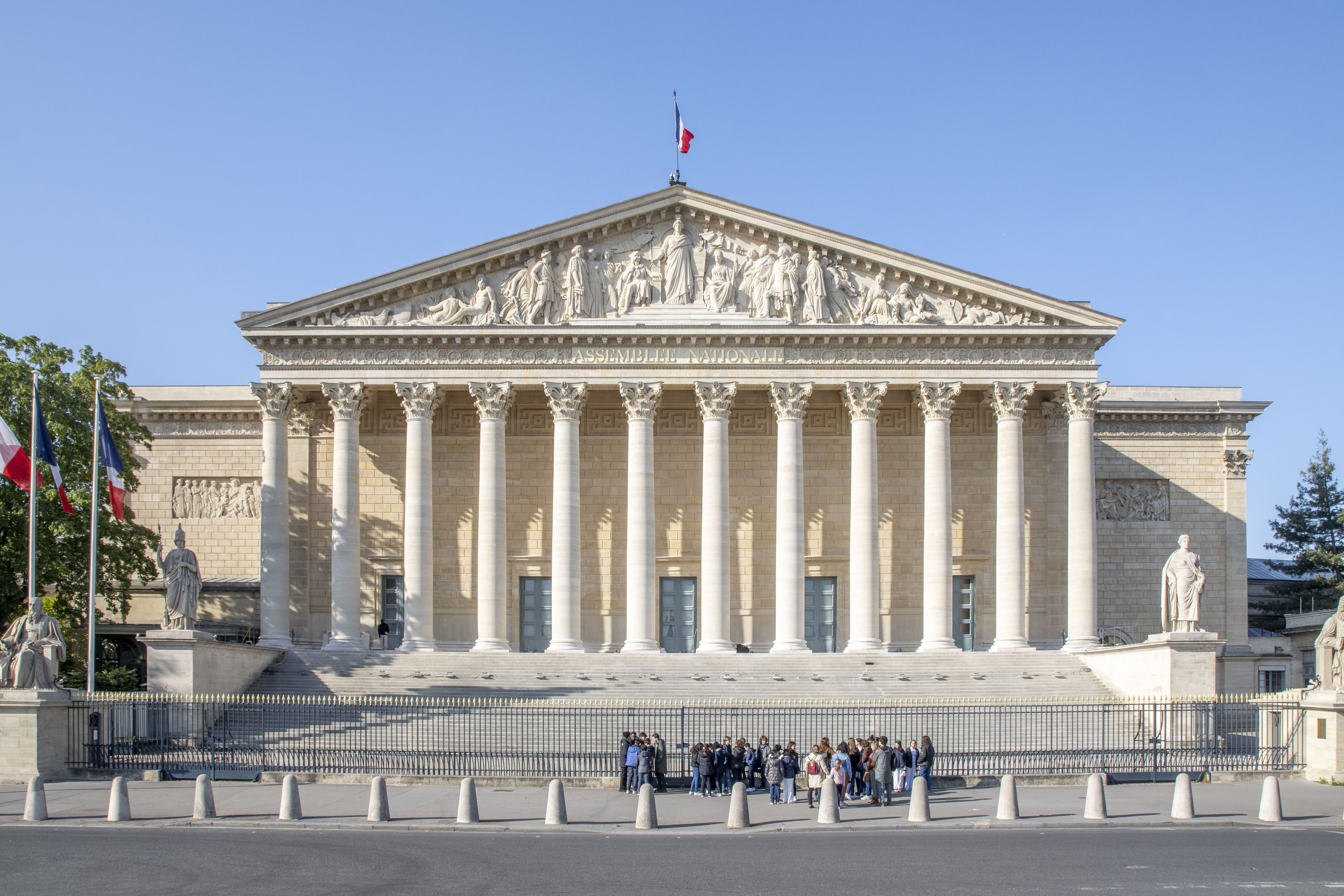
Empire style portico of the Palais Bourbon (Paris)

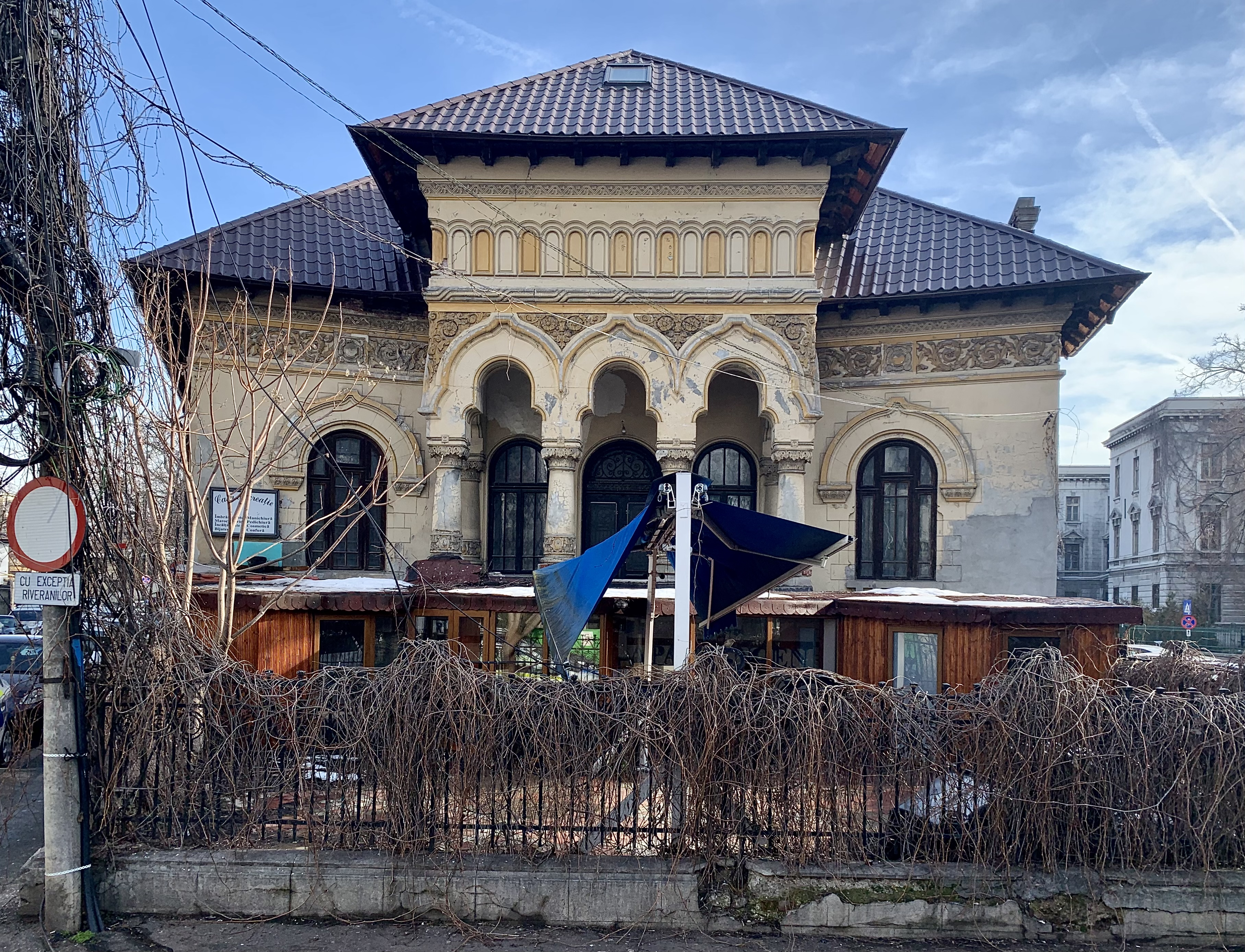
Romanian Revival portico of the Ștefan Lilovici House (Bucharest)

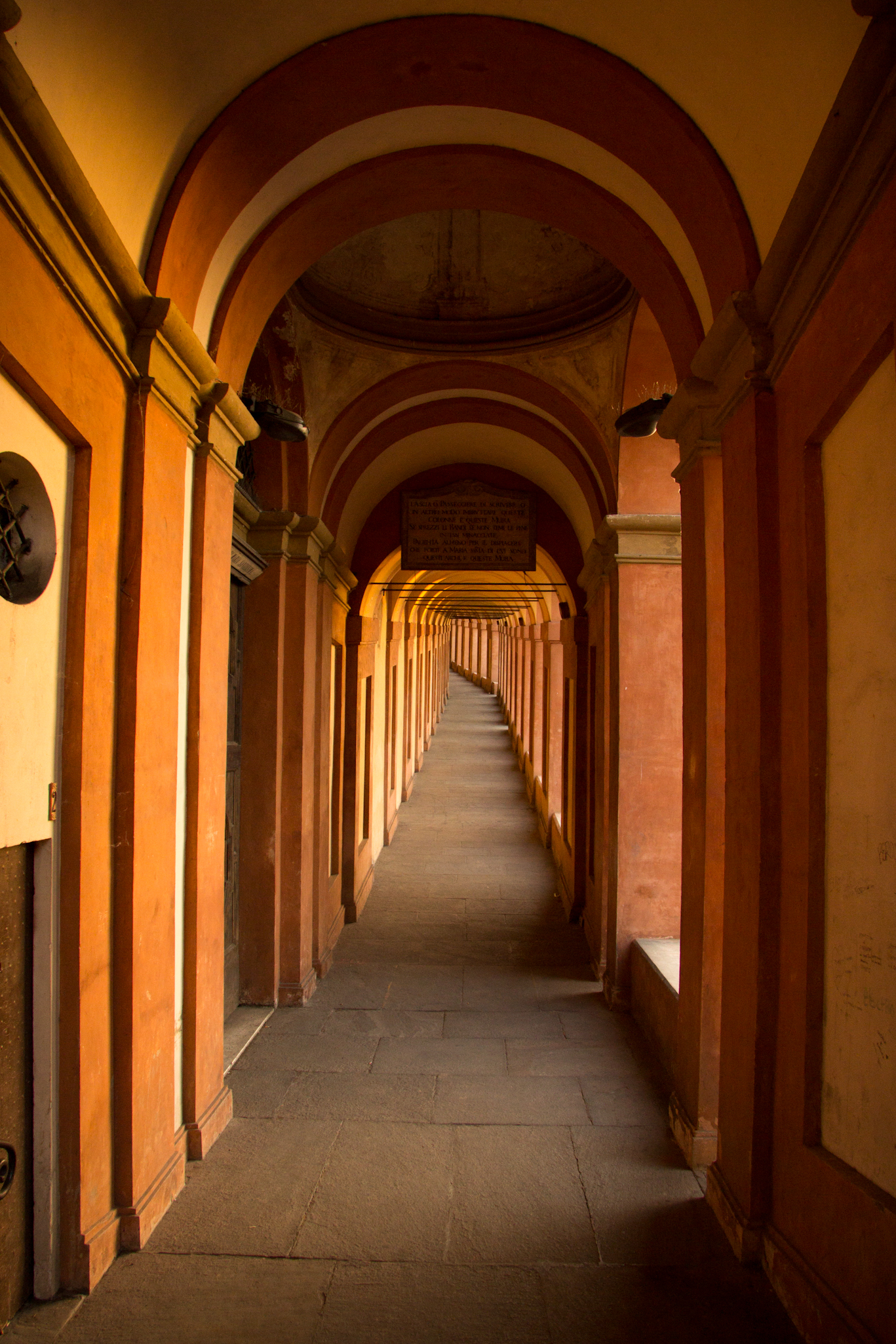
The Portico of San Luca in Bologna, Italy, which is possibly the world's longest.

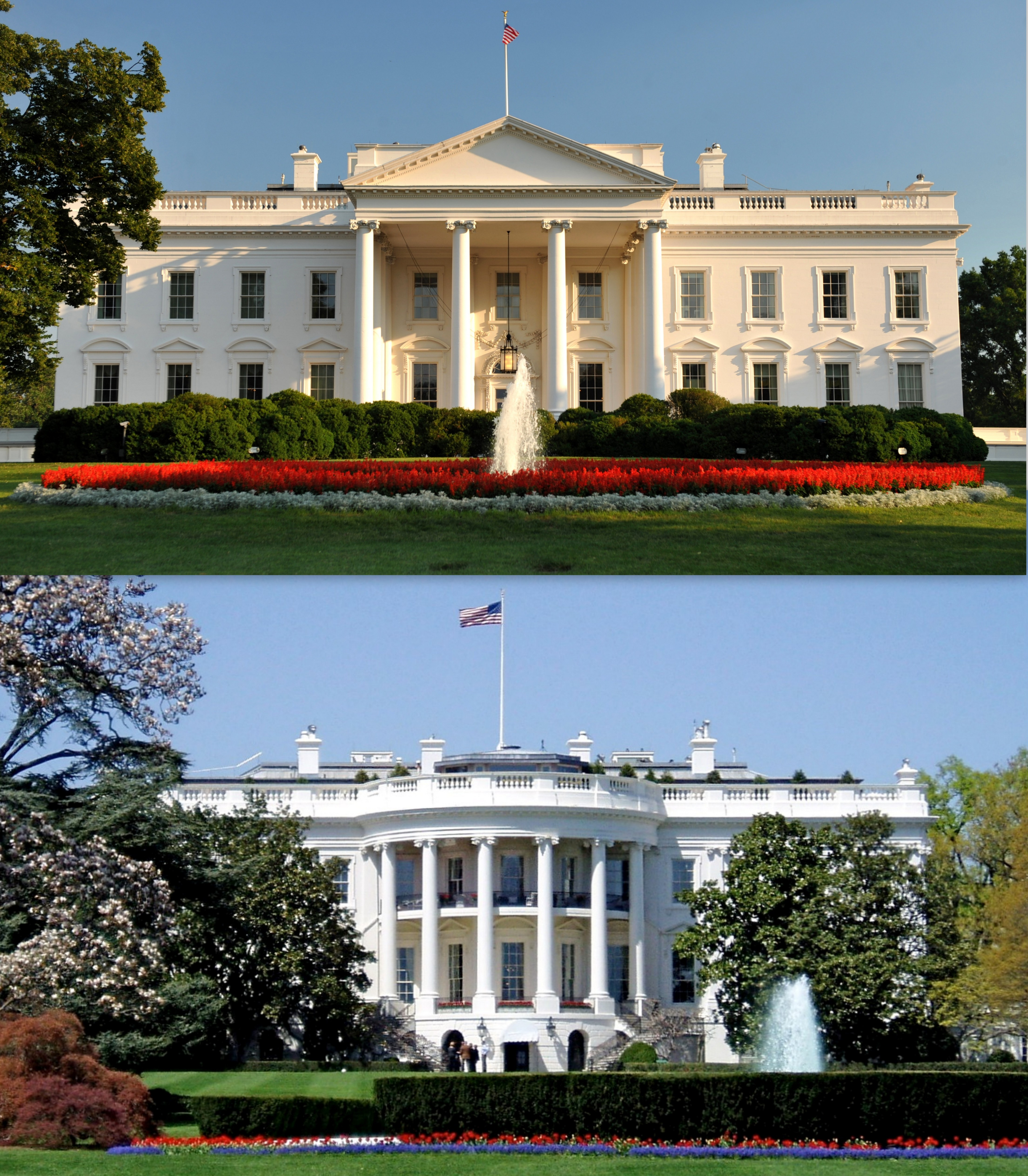
Elevations showing the north and south porticos of The White House

== See also ==
- Classical architecture – Architectural style, inspired by classical Greco-Roman architectural principles
- Cloister – Open space surrounded by covered walks or open galleries
- Gatehouse – Entrance building
- Gate tower – Entrance building
- Hypostyle – Hall with a roof supported by columns
- Loggia – Covered exterior gallery, one side open
- Outline of classical architecture
- Portal (architecture) – Access opening in a wall of a structure
- Porte-cochère – Roofed shelter outside a doorway
- Stoa – Covered walkway in ancient Greece
- Veranda – Roofed, open-air hallway or porch

== General and cited references ==
- "Greek architecture". Encyclopædia Britannica. 1968.
- Nünnerich-Asmus, Annette (1994). Basilika und Portikus. Die Architektur der Säulenhallen als Ausdruck gewandelter Urbanität in später Republik und früher Kaiserzeit [Basilica and Portico. The architecture of colonnaded halls as an expression of changing urbanity in the late Republic and early Imperial period]. Cologne: Böhlau, ISBN 3-412-09593-1.
- Stierlin, Henri (2004). Angelika Taschen (ed.). Greece: From Mycenae to the Parthenon. Cologne: Taschen. ISBN 3-8228-1225-0.
- Stierlin, Henri (2002). Silvia Kinkle (ed.). The Roman Empire: From the Etruscans to the Decline of the Roman Empire. Cologne: Taschen. ISBN 3-8228-1778-3.
