= Maison carrée =

Ancient Roman temple in Nîmes, France

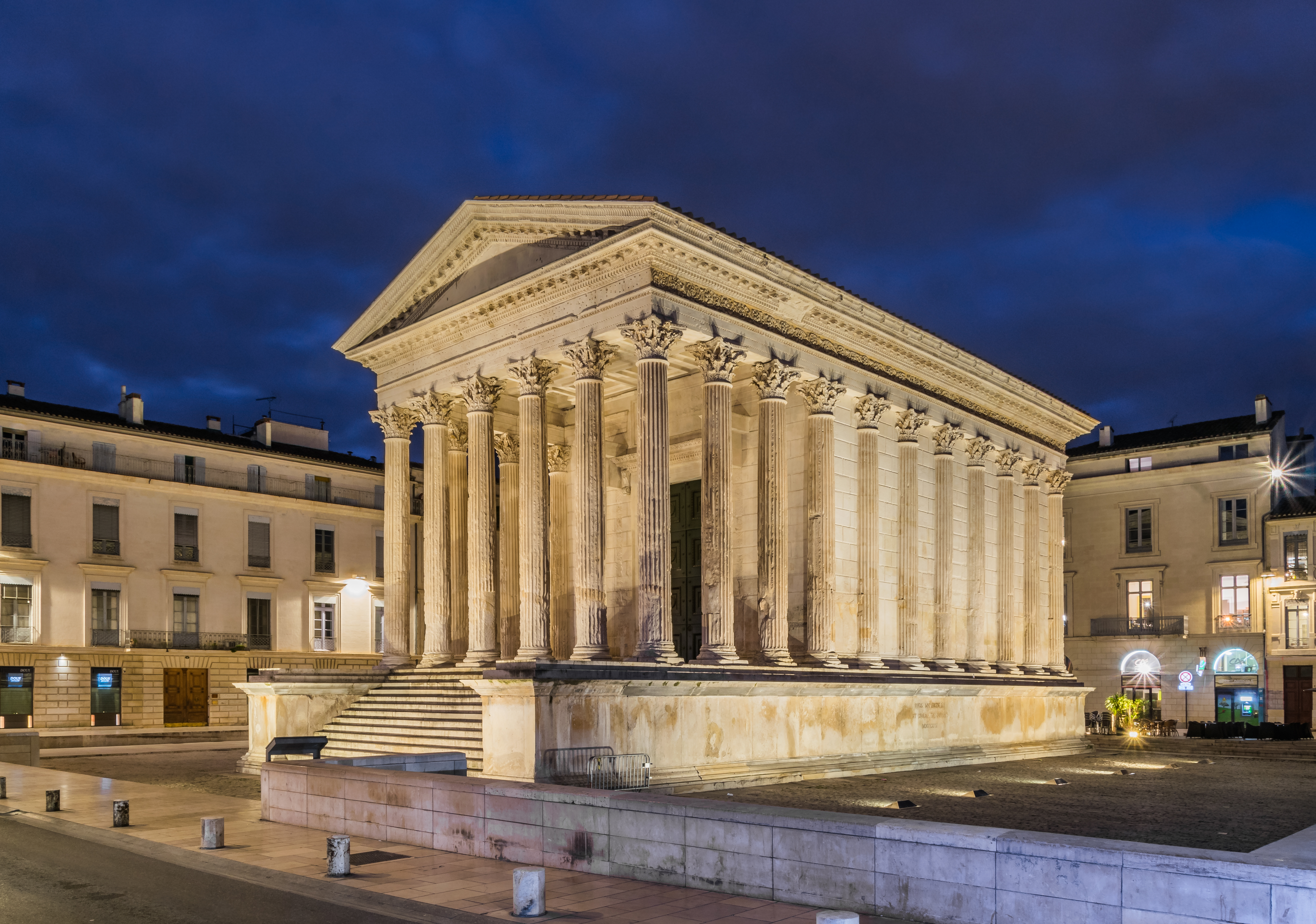
- Maison carrée in 2019
- Interactive map of the Maison carrée area

General information
- Type: Roman temple
- Architectural style: Roman
- Location: Nîmes, France
- Coordinates: 43°50′18″N 4°21′22″E
- Completed: 2 A.D (2024 years ago)
- Inaugurated: 4–7 AD

Height
- Height: 17.1m

UNESCO World Heritage Site
- Official name: The Maison Carrée of Nîmes
- Type: Cultural
- Criteria: iv
- Designated: 2023 (45th session)
- Reference no.: 1569
- UNESCO region: Europe

The Maison carrée (French pronunciation: [mɛzɔ̃ kaʁe]; French for "square house") is an ancient Roman temple in Nîmes, southern France; it is one of the best-preserved Roman temples to survive in the territory of the former Roman Empire. It is a mid-sized Augustan provincial temple of the Imperial cult, a caesareum.

The Maison carrée inspired the neoclassical Église de la Madeleine in Paris, St. Marcellinus Church in Rogalin, Poland, and in the United States the Virginia State Capitol, which was designed by Thomas Jefferson, who had a stucco model made of the Maison carrée while he was minister to France in 1785.

In September 2023, the Maison carrée of Nîmes was inscribed on the UNESCO World Heritage List.

== History ==
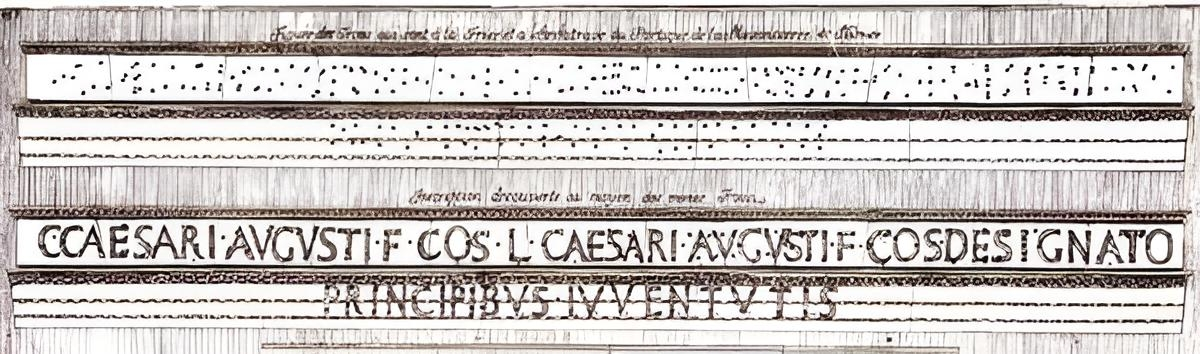
Illustration of critique of Dissertation sur l'ancienne inscription de la Maison-Carrée de Nismes published in Acta Eruditorum, 1760

In about 4–7 AD, the Maison carrée was dedicated or rededicated to Gaius and Lucius Caesar, grandsons and adopted heirs of Augustus who both died young. The inscription dedicating the temple to Gaius and Lucius was removed in medieval times. However, a local scholar, Jean-François Séguier, was able to reconstruct the inscription in 1758 from the order and number of the holes on the front frieze and architrave, to which the bronze letters had been affixed by projecting tines. According to Séguier's reconstruction, the text of the dedication read (in translation): "To Gaius Caesar, son of Augustus, Consul; to Lucius Caesar, son of Augustus, Consul designate; to the princes of youth." Another inscription was found nearby but is now lost. During the 19th century the temple slowly began to recover its original splendour, due to the efforts of Victor Grangent.

== Architecture ==
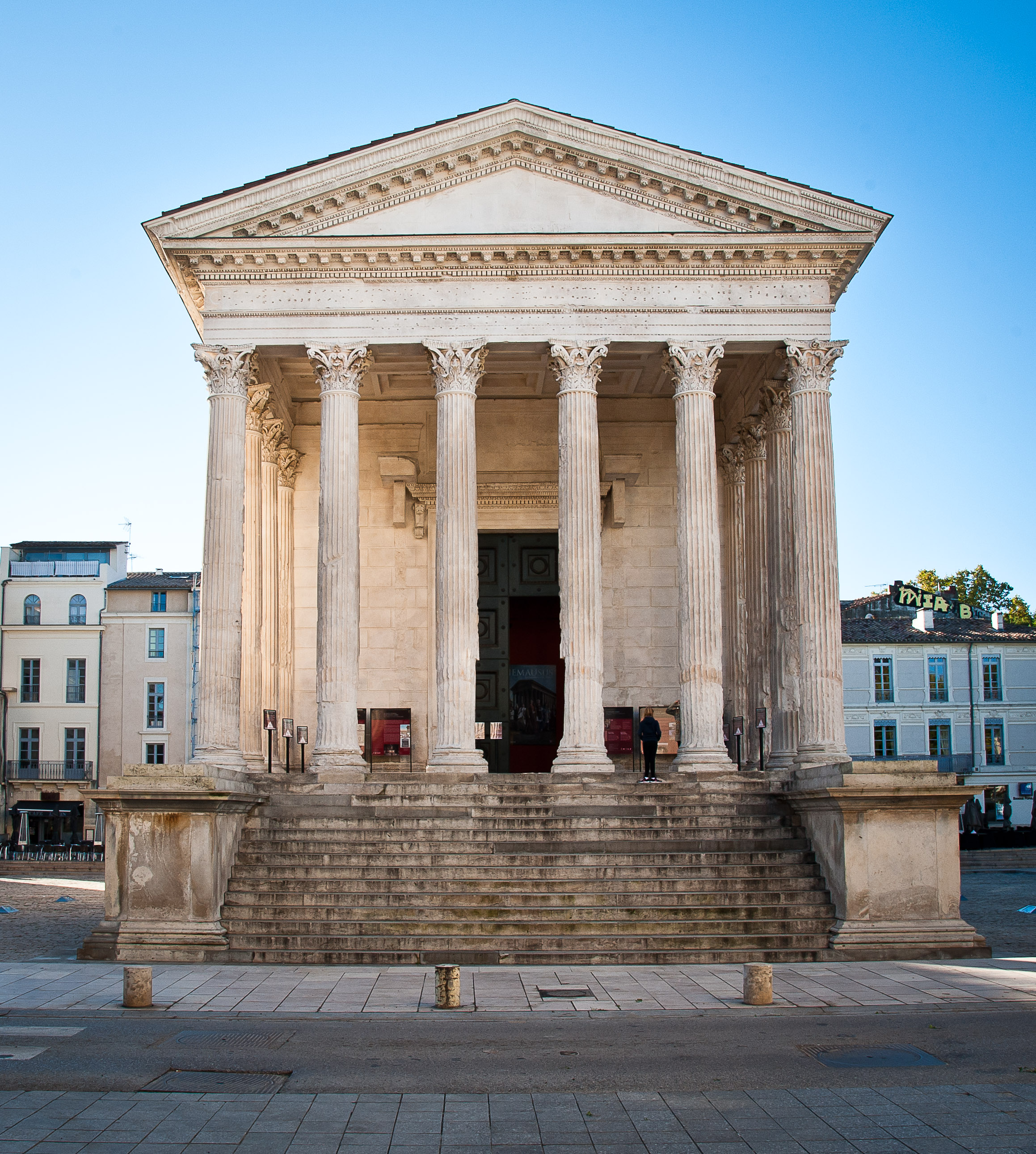
Front view

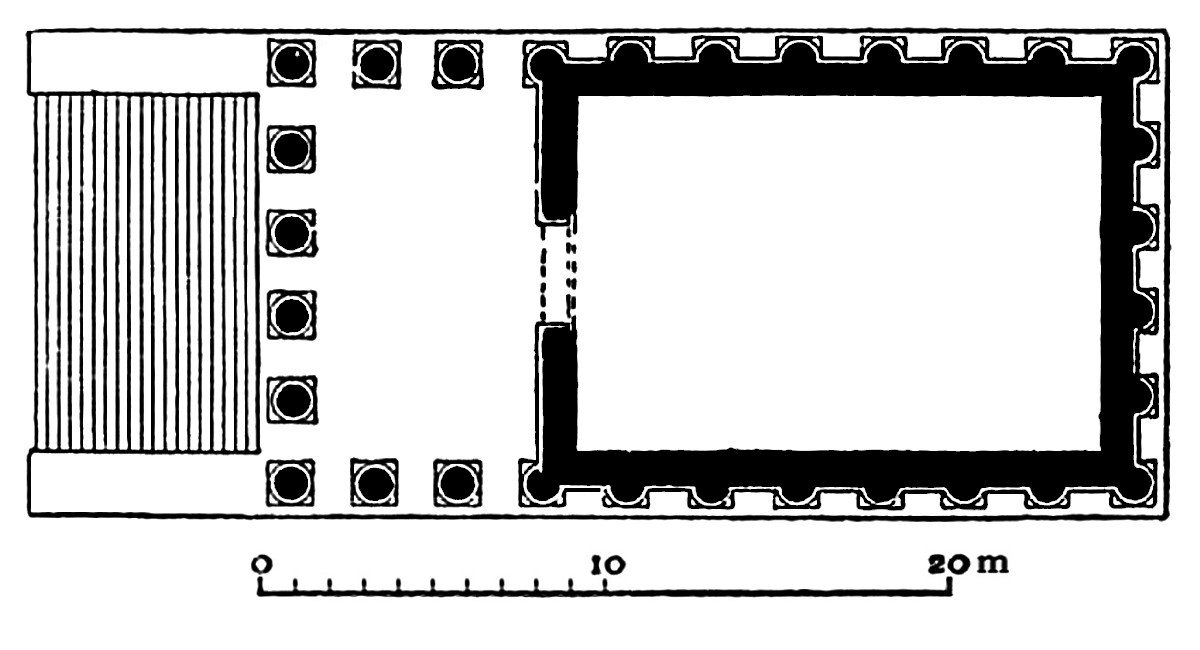
Plan of the ancient temple

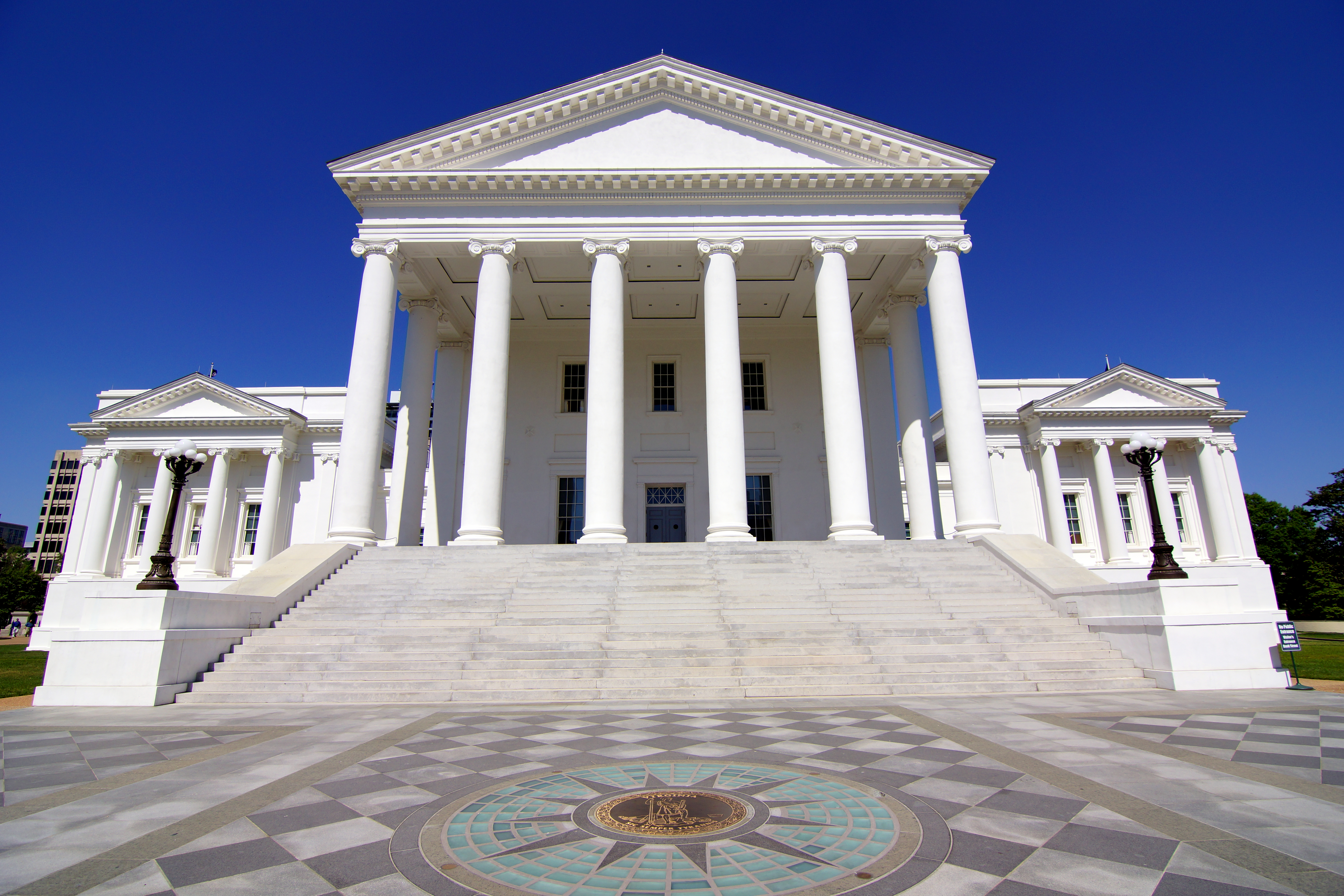
The Virginia State Capitol was modeled after the Maison carrée by Thomas Jefferson.

The Maison carrée is similar to a Tuscan-style Roman temple as described in the writings of Vitruvius, a contemporary Roman writer on architecture, although it uses the Corinthian order. Raised on a 2.85 m high podium, and at 26.42 m by 13.54 m forming a rectangle almost twice as long as it is wide, the temple dominated the forum of the Roman city of Nîmes, in what is now southern France. The facade contains a deep portico or pronaos that is almost a third of the building's length and is richly decorated in terms of its columns and capitals. This deep porch emphasizes the temple front, and distinguishes the layout from ancient Greek temples.

It is a hexastyle design with six Corinthian columns under the pediment at either end, and pseudoperipteral in that twenty engaged columns are embedded along the walls of the cella. Above the columns, the architrave is divided into three levels with ratios of 1:2:3. Egg-and-dart decoration divides the architrave from the frieze. On three sides the frieze is decorated with fine ornamental relief carvings of rosettes and acanthus leaves beneath a row of very fine dentils. However, the refinement of the decorative carvings on the building is not nearly as precise and mathematically perfect as the decoration on the Parthenon or other Greek temples.

A large door (6.87 m high by 3.27 m wide) leads to the small and windowless interior, where the shrine was originally housed. This is now used to house a tourist-oriented film on the Roman history of Nîmes. No ancient decoration remains inside the cella.

== Restorations ==
The building has undergone extensive restoration over the centuries. Until the 19th century, it formed part of a larger complex of adjoining buildings. These were demolished when the Maison carrée housed (from 1821 to 1907) what is now the Musée des Beaux-Arts de Nîmes, restoring it to the isolation it would have enjoyed in Roman times. The pronaos was restored in the early part of the 19th century when a new ceiling was provided, designed in the Roman style. The present door was made in 1824.

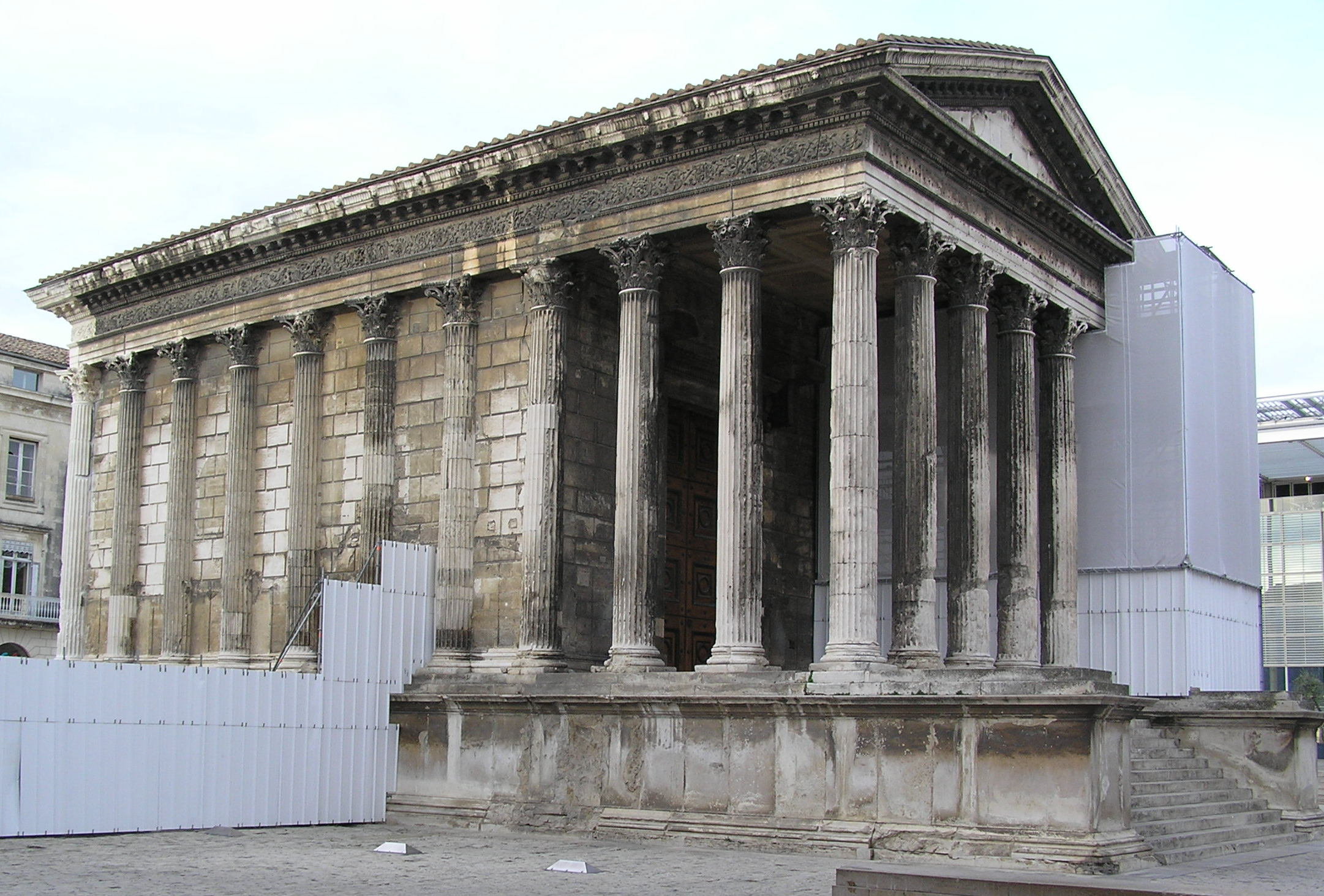
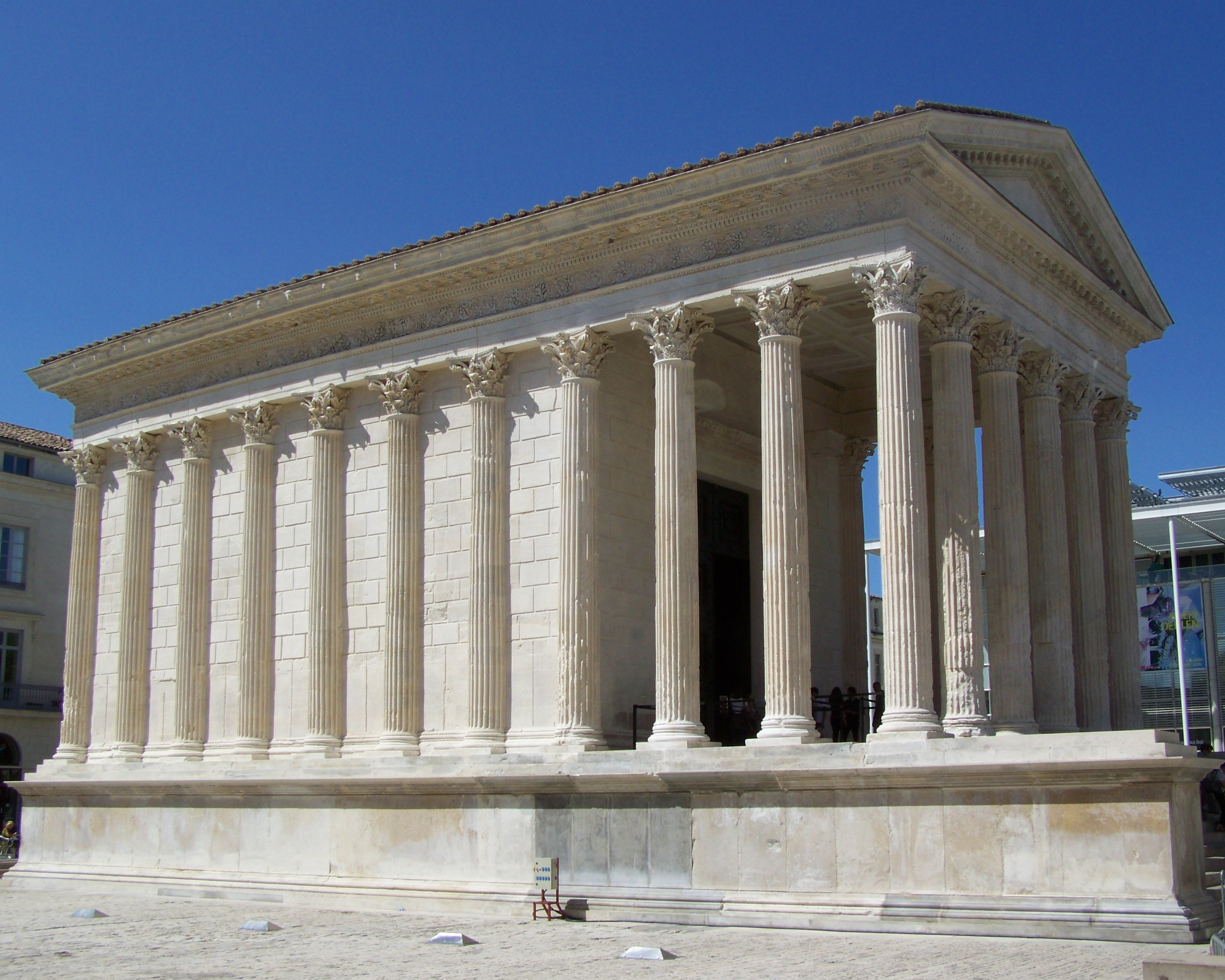
The Maison carrée during and after restoration (2006–2011)

It underwent a further restoration between 1988 and 1992, during which time it was re-roofed and the square around it was cleared, revealing the outlines of the forum. Sir Norman Foster was commissioned to build a modern art gallery and public library, known as the Carré d'Art, on the far side of the square, to replace the city theater of Nîmes, which had burnt down in 1952.

== See also ==
- List of Ancient Roman temples
