= Cella =

Inner chamber of Ancient Greek or Roman temples

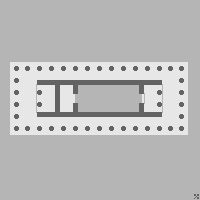
Temple layout with cella highlighted in gray

In Classical architecture, a cella (Latin for 'small chamber') or naos (from Ancient Greek ναός (naós) 'temple') is the inner chamber of an ancient Greek or Roman temple. Its enclosure within walls has given rise to extended meanings: of a hermit's or monk's cell, and (since the 17th century) of a biological cell in plants or animals.

== Greek and Roman temples ==
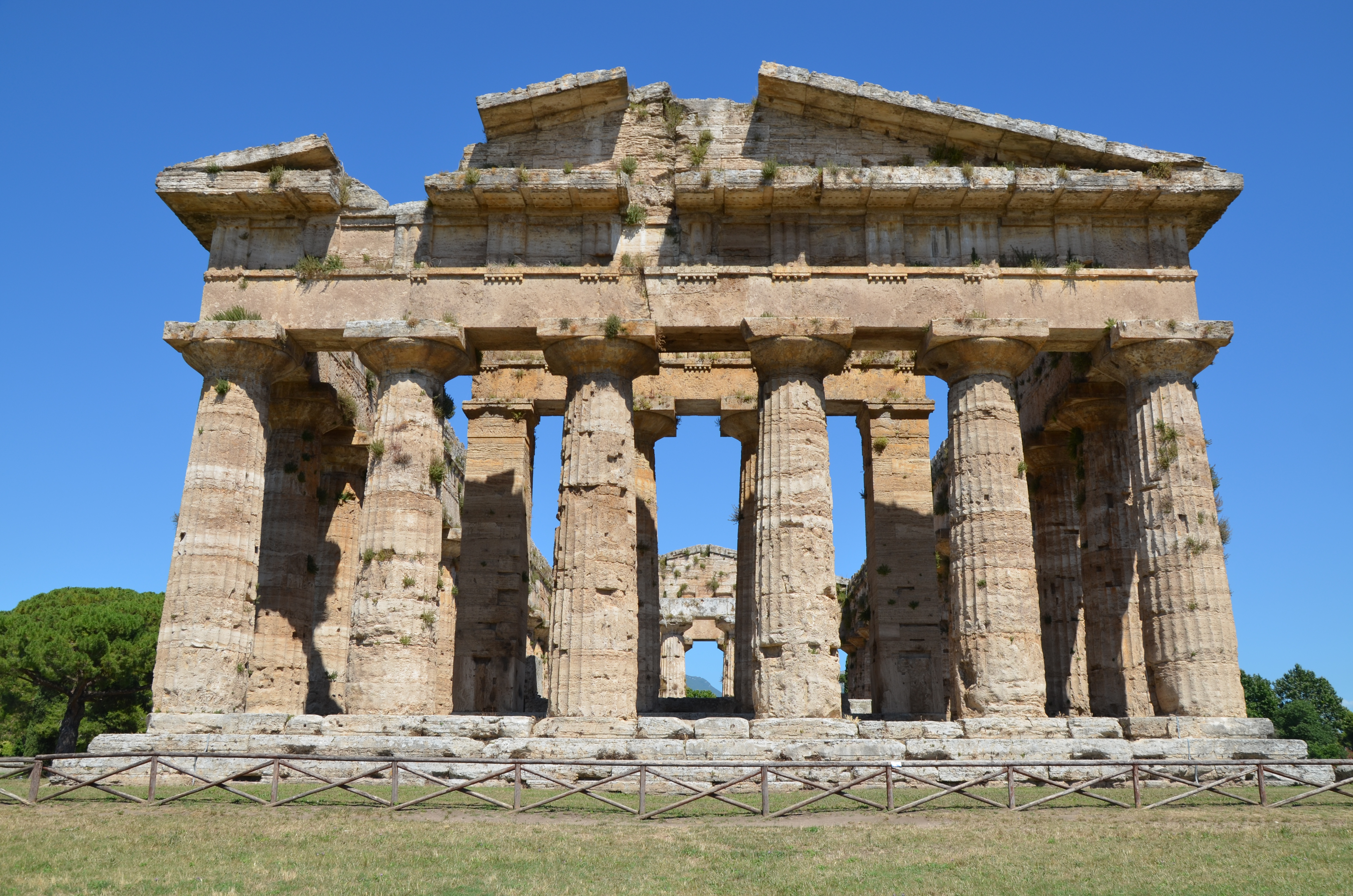
Greek Temple of Apollo at Paestum with centrally located cella

In ancient Greek and Roman temples, the cella was a room at the center of the building, usually containing a cult image or statue representing the particular deity venerated in the temple. In addition, the cella might contain a table to receive supplementary votive offerings, such as votive statues of associated deities, precious and semi-precious stones, helmets, spear and arrow heads, swords, and war trophies. No gatherings or sacrifices took place in the cella, as the altar for sacrifices was always located outside the building along the axis and temporary altars for other deities were built next to it. The accumulated offerings made Greek and Roman temples virtual treasuries, and many of them were indeed used as treasuries during antiquity.

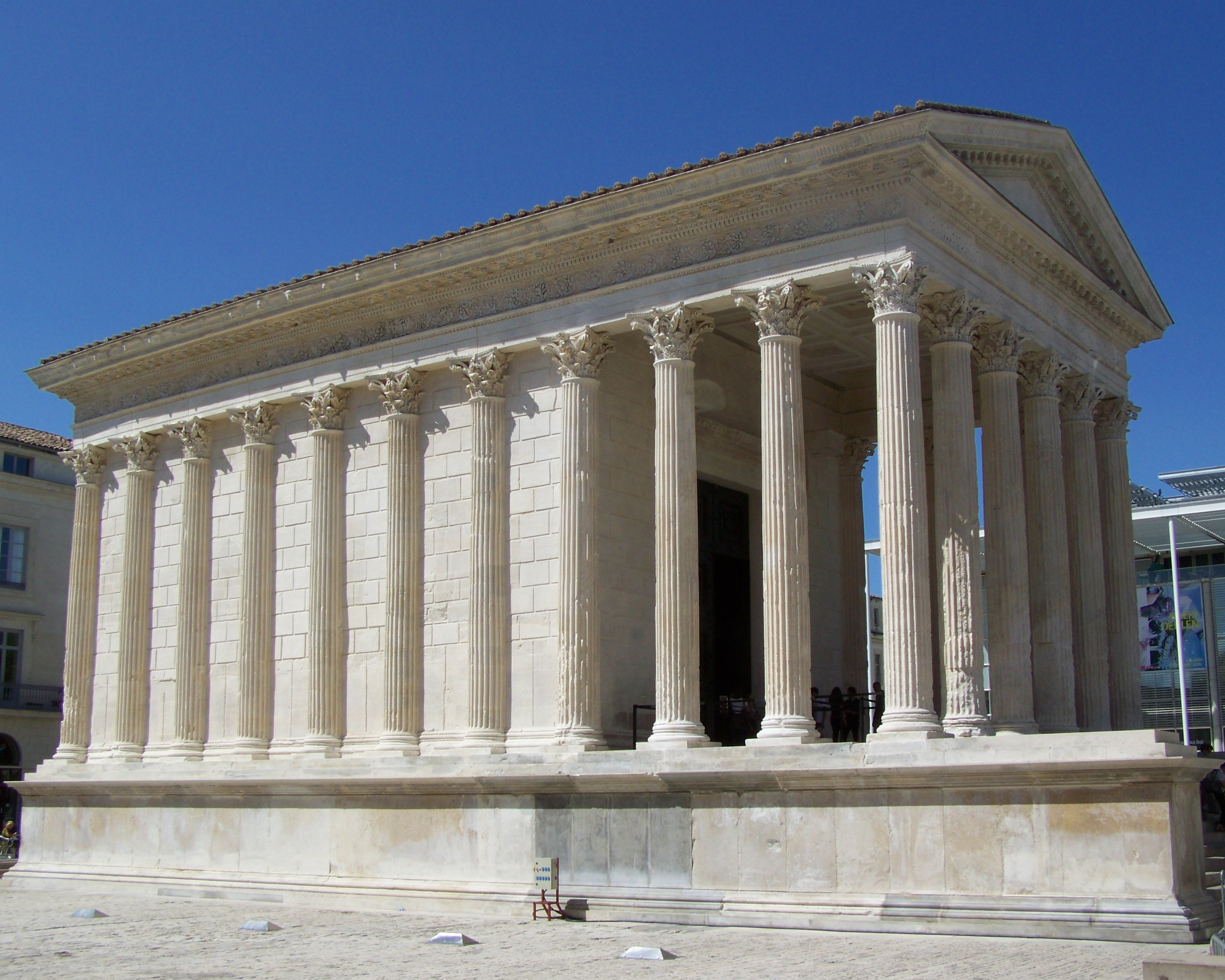
The Maison Carrée at Nîmes with its cella offset behind the hexastyle portico

The cella was typically a simple, windowless, rectangular room with a door or open entrance at the front behind a colonnaded portico facade. In larger temples, the cella was typically divided by two colonnades into a central nave flanked by two aisles. A cella may also contain an adyton, an inner area restricted to access by the priests—in religions that had a consecrated priesthood—or by the temple guard.

With very few exceptions, Greek buildings were of a peripteral design that placed the cella in the center of the plan, such as the Parthenon and the Temple of Apollo at Paestum. The Romans favoured pseudoperipteral buildings with a portico offsetting the cella to the rear. The pseudoperipteral plan uses engaged columns embedded along the side and rear walls of the cella. The Temple of Venus and Roma built by Hadrian in Rome had two cellae arranged back-to-back enclosed by a single outer peristyle.

== Etruscan temples ==
According to Vitruvius, the Etruscan type of temples (as, for example, at Portonaccio, near Veio) had three cellae, side by side, conjoined by a double row of columns on the façade. This is an entirely new setup with respect to the other types of constructions found in Etruria and the Tyrrhenian side of Italy, which have one cella with or without columns, as seen in Greece and the Orient.

== Egyptian temples ==
In the Hellenistic culture of the Ptolemaic Kingdom in ancient Egypt, the cella referred to that which is hidden and unknown inside the inner sanctum of an Egyptian temple, existing in complete darkness, meant to symbolize the state of the universe before the act of creation. The cella, also called the naos, holds many box-like shrines. The Greek word "naos" has been extended by archaeologists to describe the central room of the pyramids. Towards the end of the Old Kingdom, naos construction went from being subterranean to being built directly into the pyramid, above ground. The naos was surrounded by many different paths and rooms, many used to confuse and divert thieves and grave robbers.

== Christian churches ==
In early Christian and Byzantine architecture, the cella or naos is an area at the center of the church reserved for performing the liturgy.

In later periods, a small chapel or monk's cell was also called a cella. This is the source of the Irish language cill or cell (Anglicised as Kil(l)-) in many Irish place names.

== See also ==
- List of Greco-Roman roofs

== Bibliography ==
- Trachtenberg and Hyman, Architecture: From Prehistory to Post Modernity (second edition).
