= Valle dei Templi =

Archaeological site

Archaeological Area of Agrigento
UNESCO World Heritage Site
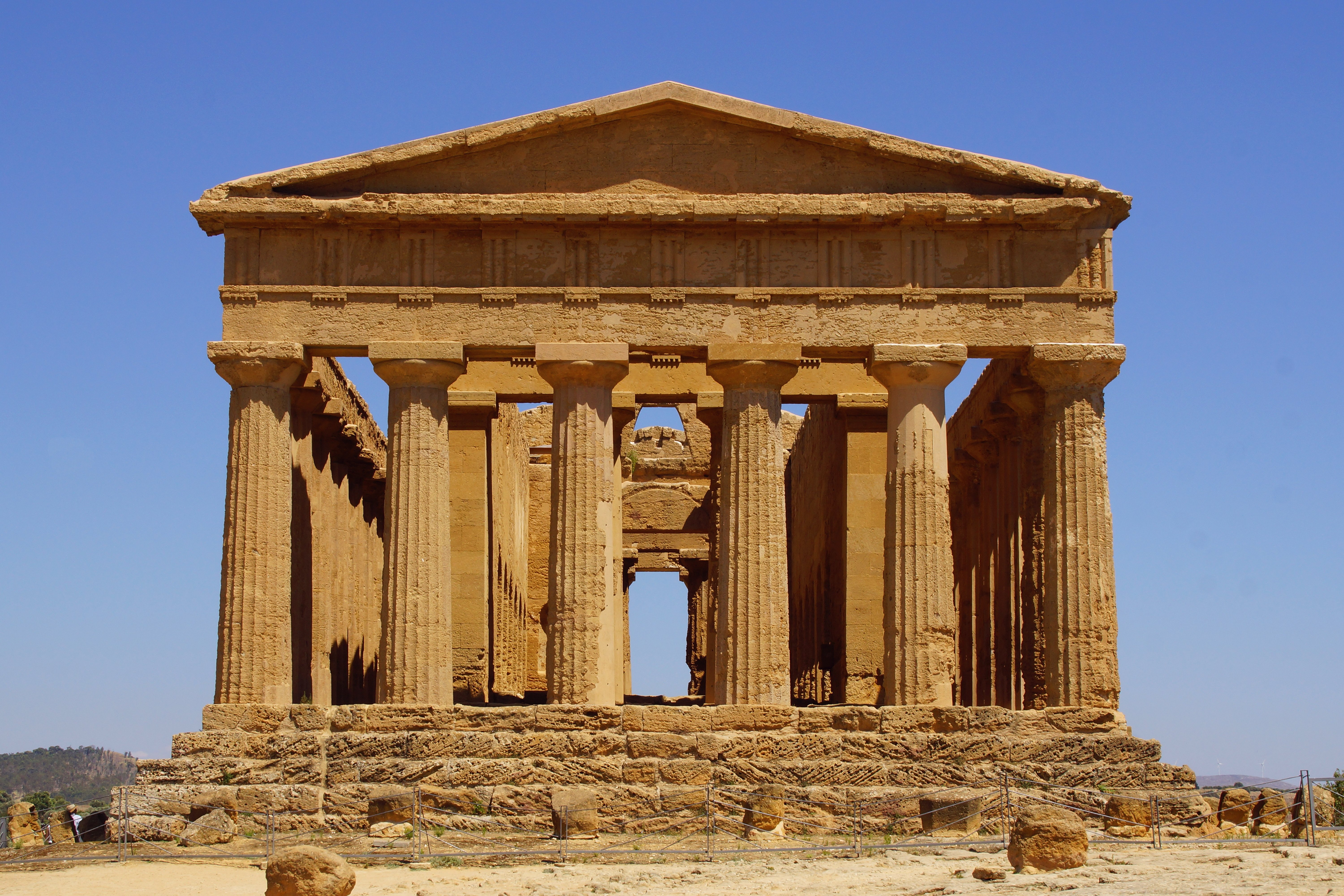
- Temple of Concordia

- Location within Sicily Location within Italy
- Location: Agrigento, Province of Agrigento, Sicily, Italy
- Criteria: Cultural: (i)(ii)(iii)(iv)
- Reference: 831
- Inscription: 1997 (21st Session)
- Area: 1,300 ha (3,200 acres)
- Buffer zone: 1,869 ha (4,620 acres)
- Website: www.parcovalledeitempli.it
- Coordinates: 37°17′23″N 13°35′36″E

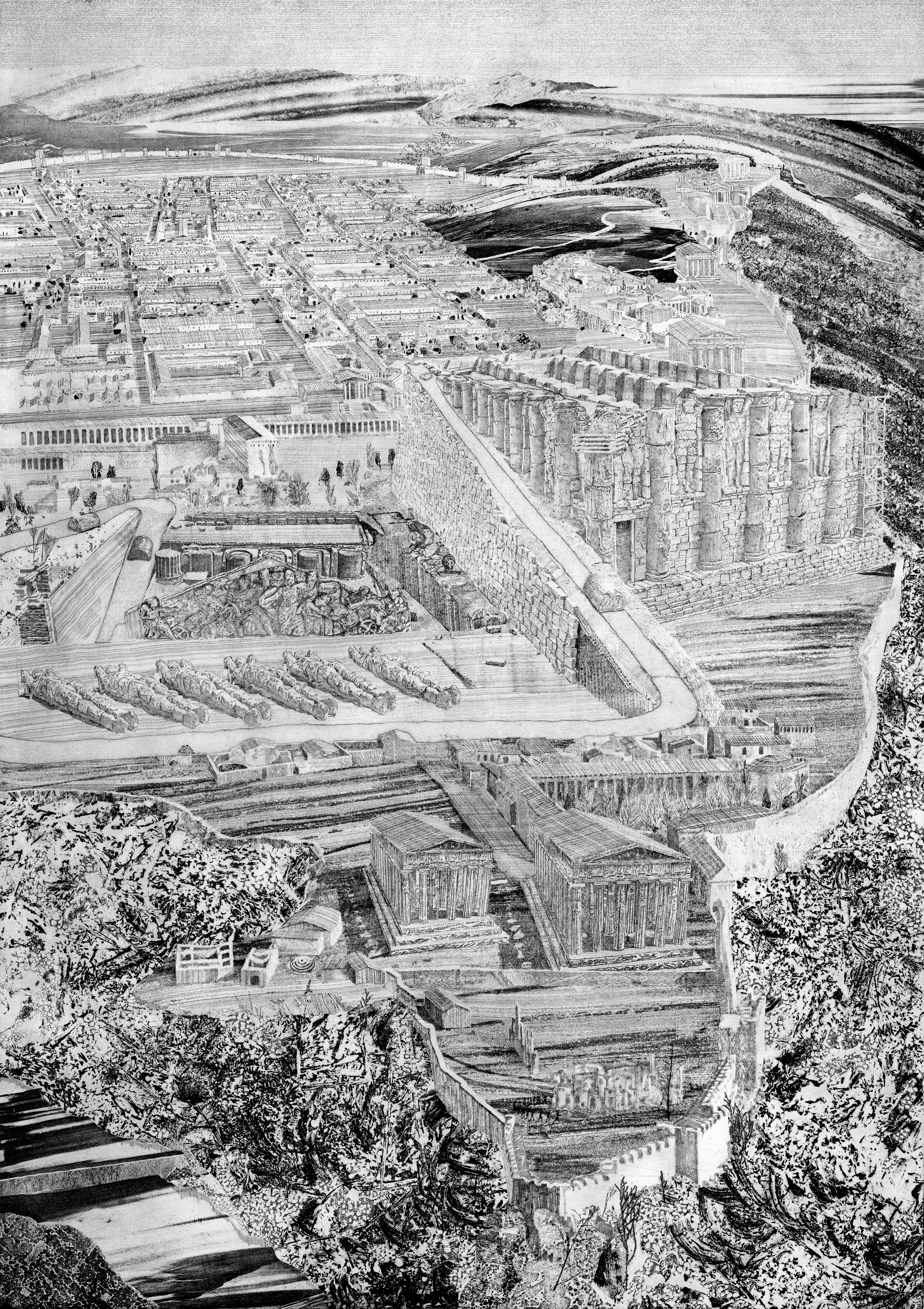
Akragas 406 a. Chr. n.

The Valle dei Templi (Italian: [ˈvalle dei ˈtɛmpli]; Sicilian: Vaddi di li Tempri), or Valley of the Temples, is an archaeological site in Agrigento (ancient Greek: Ακράγας, Akragas), Sicily. It is one of the most outstanding examples of ancient Greek art and architecture of Magna Graecia, and is one of the main attractions of Sicily. The term "valley" is a misnomer, the site being located on a ridge outside the town of Agrigento.

Since 1997, the entire area has been included in the UNESCO World Heritage List. The archaeological and landscape park of the Valle dei Templi, with its 1300 hectares, is the largest archaeological park in Europe and the Mediterranean basin.

== Overview ==
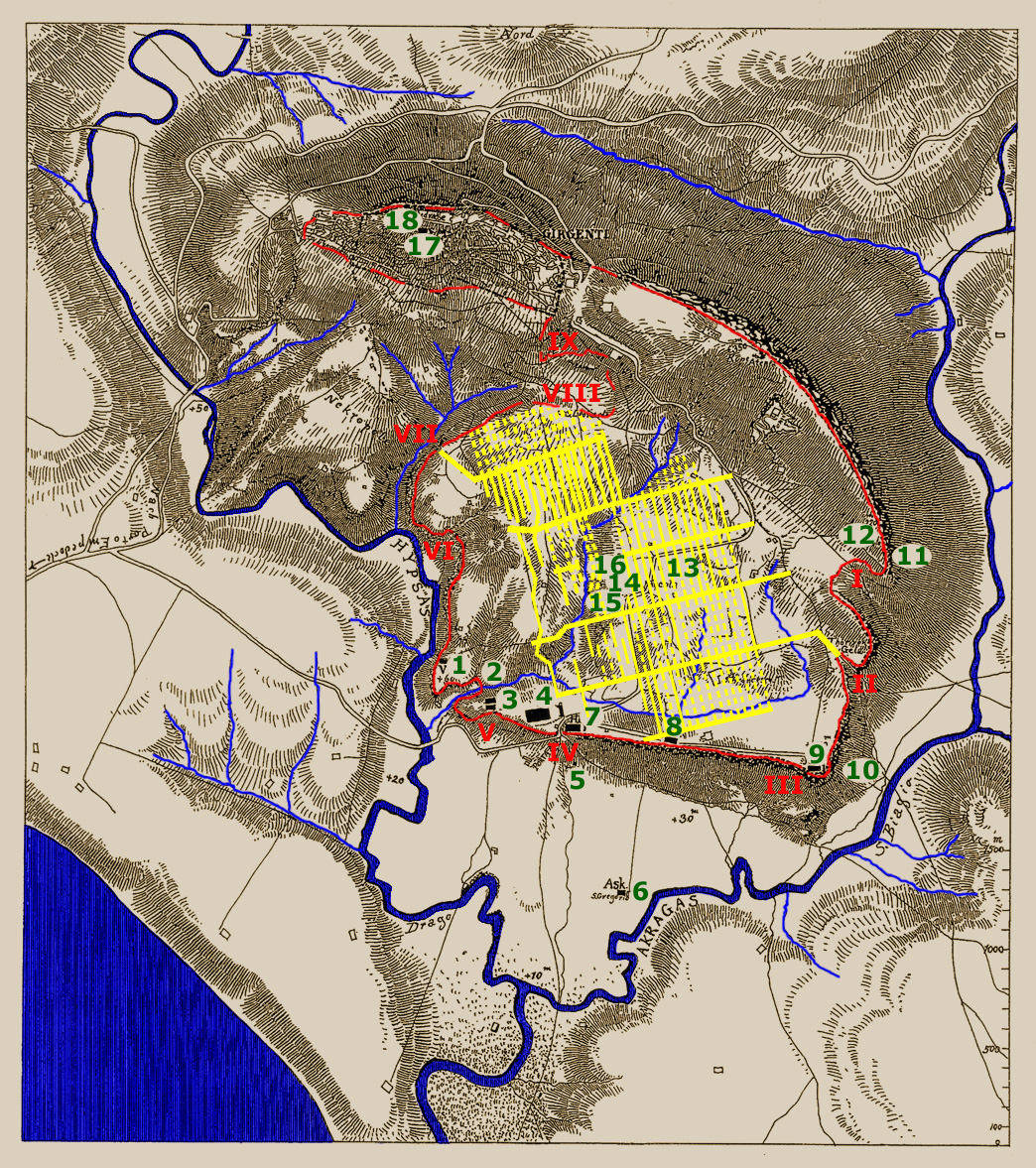
I–IX Town gates, 1 Temple of Hephaestus, 2 Kolymbéthra, 3 Sanctuary of the chthonic gods with Temple of the Dioscuri and Temple L, 4 Temple of Olympian Zeus, 5 Tomb of Theron and Hellenistic-roman nekropolis, 6 Temple of Asclepius, 7 Temple of Hercules, 8 Temple of Concordia and Early Christian nekropolis, 9 Temple of "Hera", 10 Basilicula, 11 Rock sanctuary of Demeter, 12 Temple of Demeter, 13 Hellenistic-roman quarter, 14 San Nicola and Archeological Museum, 15 Ekklesiasterion and Oratory of Phalaris, 16 Bouleuterion, 17 Temple of Athena, 18 Temple of Zeus

The Valley includes remains of seven temples, all in Doric style. The ascription of the names, apart from that of the Olympeion, is a mere tradition established in Renaissance times. The temples are:

- Temple of Concordia, whose name comes from a Latin inscription found nearby, and which was built in the 5th century BC. Turned into a church in the 6th century AD, it is now one of the best preserved in the Valley.
- Temple of "Hera", also built in the 5th century BC. It was burnt in 406 BC by the Carthaginians.
- Temple of Heracles, who was one of the most venerated deities in the ancient Akragas. It is the most ancient in the Valley: destroyed by an earthquake, it consists today of only eight columns.
- Temple of Olympian Zeus, built in 480 BC to celebrate the city-state's victory over Carthage. The use of large-scale atlases characterizes it.
- Temple of Castor and Pollux. Despite its remains including only four columns, it is now the symbol of modern Agrigento.
- Temple of Hephaestus (Vulcan), also dating from the 5th century BC. It is thought to have been one of the most imposing constructions in the valley; it is now, however, one of the most eroded.
- Temple of Asclepius, located far from the ancient town's walls; it was the goal of pilgrims seeking cures for illness.

The Valley is also home to the so-called Tomb of Theron, a large tuff monument of pyramidal shape; scholars suppose it was built to commemorate the Romans killed in the Second Punic War.

== Temple of Concordia ==
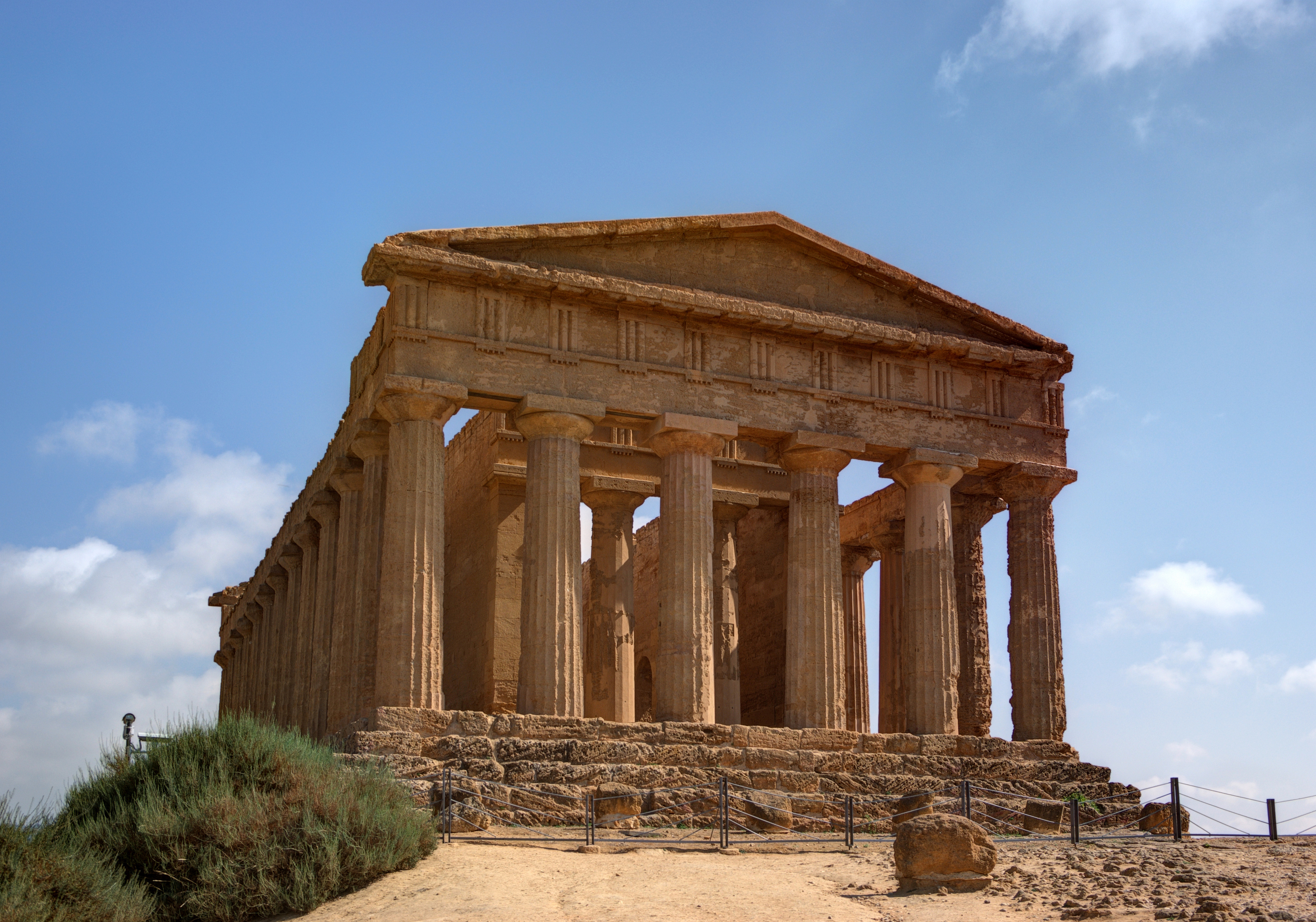
West facade of Temple of Concordia

Due to its good state of preservation, the Temple of Concordia is ranked amongst the most notable edifices of the Greek civilization existing today. Notably, the UNESCO symbol alludes to this temple's six-column facade. It has a peristasis of 6 × 13 columns built over a basement of 39.44 × 16.91 m; each Doric column has twenty grooves and a slight entasis, and is surmounted by an architrave with triglyphs and metopes; also perfectly preserved are the tympani. The cella, preceded by a pronaos, is accessed by a single step; also existing are the pylons with the stairs that allow reaching the roof and, over the cella's walls and in the blocks of the peristasis entablature, the holes for the wooden beam of the ceiling. The exterior and the interior of the temple were covered by polychrome stucco. The upper frame had gutters with lion-like protomes, while marble tiles covered the roof.

When the temple was turned into a church, the entrance was moved to the rear, and the rear wall of the cella was destroyed. The spaces between the columns were closed, while 12 arched openings were created in the cella, in order to obtain a structure with one nave and two aisles. The pagan altar was destroyed, and sacristies were carved out in the eastern corners. The sepultures visible inside and outside the temple date to the High Middle Ages.

== Temple of "Hera" ==
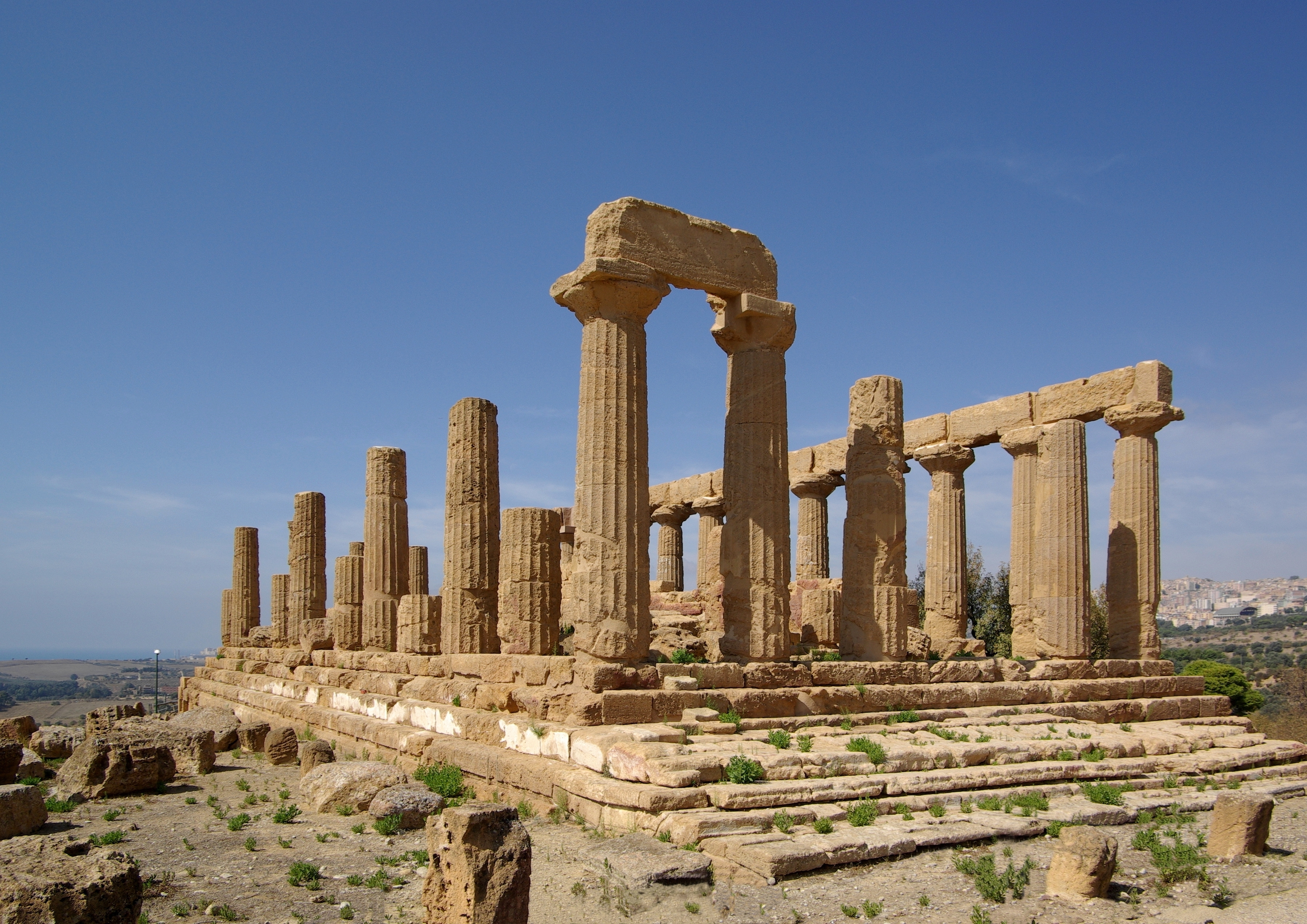
Temple of "Hera"

This temple lies at the easternmost end of the ridge and is built on a huge artificial terrace. It dates to c. 450 BC, measuring 38.15 × 16.9 m: it is in Doric style, peripteros six columns wide by thirteen long, preceded by a pronaos and opisthodomos. The base has four steps.

Current remains (including anastylosis from the 18th century onwards) consist of the front colonnade with parts of the architrave and of the frieze. Only fragments of the other three sides survive, with few elements of the cella. The building was damaged in the fire of 406 BC and restored in Roman times, with the substitution of marble tiles with ones of clay, and the addition of a steep rise in the area where today can be seen the remains of the altar.

Nearby are arcosolia and other sepultures from Byzantine times, belonging to the late 6th century AD renovation of the Temple of Concordia into a Christian church.

== Temple of Asclepius ==
The Temple of Asclepius is located in the middle of the San Gregorio plain. Its identification is based on a mention by Polybius (I, 18, 2), who states that the temple was "in front of the city", one mile away. However, as the actual distance does not correspond and the size of the building is relatively small, scholars remain dubious about this attribution.

The small temple, probably dating to the late 5th century BC and measuring 21.7 × 10.7 m, rises over a basement with three steps. Its peculiarity is the fake opysthodomus with two semi-columns on the external side of the rear cella. Also extant are parts of the entablature, with lion-like protomes, a frieze, and a geison pediment.

The sanctuary housed a bronze statue of Apollo by Myron, a gift to the city by Scipio, which was stolen by Verres.

== Temple of Heracles ==
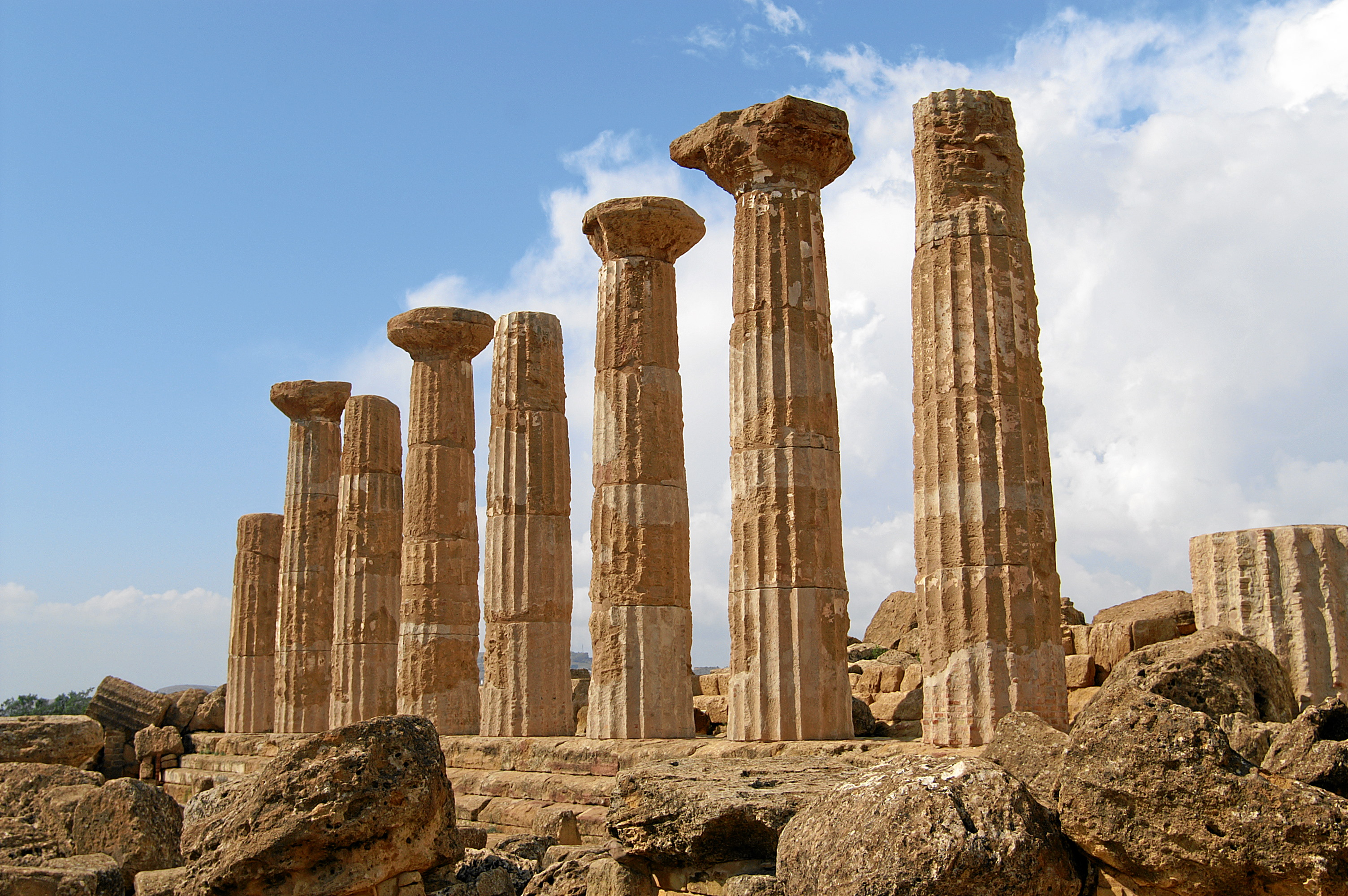
Remains of the Temple of Heracles.

The traditional name of this temple comes from another mention by Cicero about a temple dedicated to the classical hero "not far from the forum"; however, it has never been proven that the latter (the agora of the Greek city) was located at this point.

Stylistically, the temple belongs to the last years of the 6th century BC. It has also been suggested that this temple was one of the first built under Theron. Also, the entablature, of which parts have been found, would date it to the 470–460s or the middle 5th century BC (though the more recent remains could be a replacement of the older ones). One hypothesis is that the temple was begun before the Battle of Himera, to be completed only in the following decades. Polyaenus mentions a temple of Athena being built under Theron outside the city, which could be identified with that of "Hercules", though also with a new one in the inner acropolis.

The building, with 20th-century anastylosis, measures 67 × 25.34 m, with a peristasis of 6 × 15 Doric columns and a cella with pronaos and opysthodomus, is located over a three-step basement. It is the first example (later became common in the Agrigento temples) of pylons inserted between the pronaos and cella, housing the stairs which allowed inspections of the roof. The columns are rather high and have wide capitals. On the eastern side are the remains of the large altar.

== Olympeion field ==
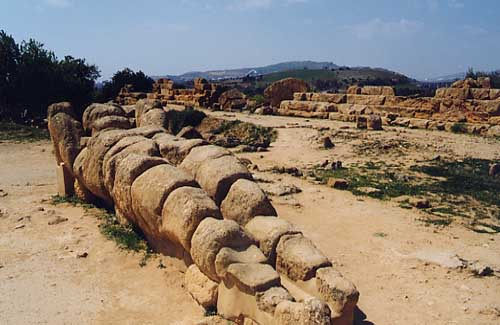
Remains of one atlas in the Olympeion field

On the other side of the road running through the Golden Gate of the ancient city, is a plain commanded by the huge Olympion field. This includes a platea with a large temple to Olympian Zeus, plus other areas still under investigation. These include a sanctuary, with remains of a paved square, a complex sacellum ("holy enclosure") and a tholos. This, after another gate, is followed by a sanctuary of chthonic deities, an archaic sanctuary, the so-called colimbetra (where a still unknown gate was), and the tip of the spur where the sanctuary is located, with the Temple of Vulcan.

The Olympeion complex's main attraction is the huge Temple of Olympian Zeus, which was described with enthusiastic words by Diodorus Siculus and mentioned by Polybius. Today it is reduced to ruins due to destruction begun in antiquity and continued through the 18th century, when the temple was used as a quarry for the port of Porto Empedocle.

Near the south-western corner of the temples is a small edifice (12,45 × 5,90 m) with two naves and a deep pronaos, a double entrance and what has been identified as an altar. Its dating is controversial, though scholars have assigned it to the Archaic era, due to the discovery of numerous 6th-century BC vases. Also archaic is another sacellum, which was later replaced by a classical edifice. These are followed by the scant remains of a temple (called "Tempio L") dating to the mid-5th century BC, measuring 41.8 × 20.20 meters, to which, in the 3rd century BC, a Hellenistic entablature was added.

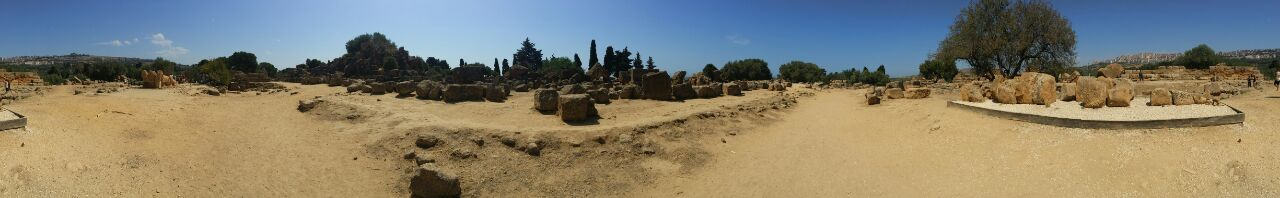
Panorama Remains of one original atlas in the Olympeion field
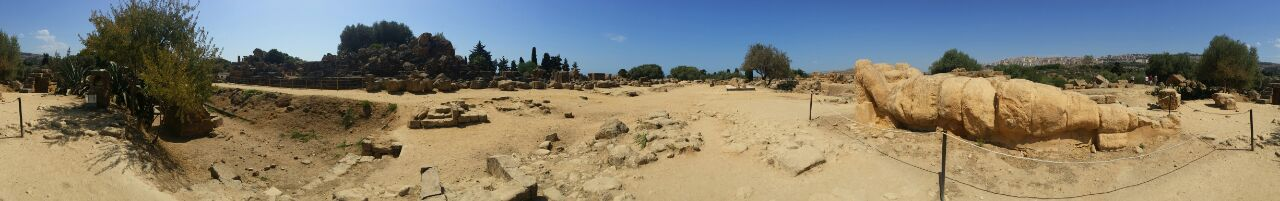
Panorama Remains of one reconstructed atlas in the Olympeion field

== Temple of the Dioscuri ==
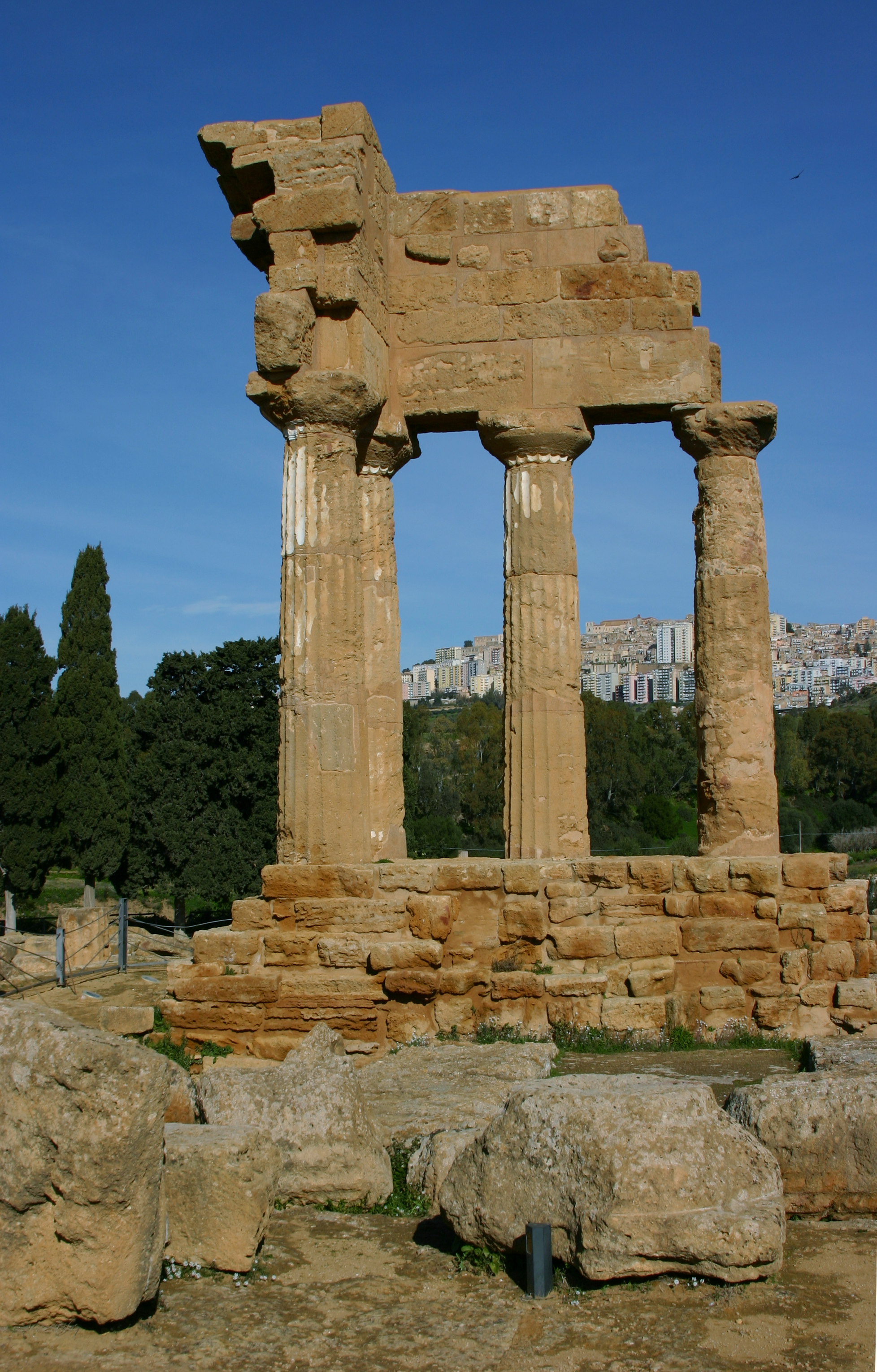
The re-assembled remains of the Temples of "Castor and Pollux".

North of Temple L is the "Temple of the Dioscuri," Castor and Pollux, the northwest corner of which is in a misleading modern reconstruction from the early 19th century, created using pieces from various other temples. It includes four columns and an entablature. The temple itself measures 31 m × 13.39 m (101.7 ft × 43.9 ft), and would likely have been a Doric peripteral with 6 × 13 columns, dating to about the mid-5th century. BC.

== Temple of Hephaestus ==
On the other side of the valley is the last spur of the hill, commanded by the remains of the Temple of Hephaestus (also called the Temple of Vulcan), although the exact deity to whom it is dedicated is unknown. It is a Doric-style peripteral building measuring 43 m × 20.85 m (141.1 ft × 68.4 ft), mounted on a four-step crepidoma and having 6 × 13 columns; it dates to around 430 BC. It was built over an archaic sacellum which measures 13.25 m × 6.50 m (43.5 ft × 21.3 ft). Its decoration, dating to ca. 560-550 BC, has been recently reconstructed.

== Other remains ==
On the western side of the city are the remains of Gates VI and VII. The first probably lies on the road to Heracles, the second has two towers and two external bastions (one having 15-meter thick walls); northwards are the remains of Gates VIII and IX, now surrounded by illegal buildings.

At the western tip of the area in which the Temple of Concordia lies are parts of a late-ancient or early-medieval necropolis, constructed on existing cisterns. Other tombs and catacombs are visible in the so-called Grotte Fragapane, dating to the 4th century AD.

These late-Roman and Byzantine necropolises lie in an area used for tombs since ancient times. One of these, the so-called Tomb of Theron, is a naiskos sepulcher with a square plan. Gate IV is located near the tomb of Theron: probably one of the most important in the city, as it led to the sea.

West of the Olympeion, are remains of two insulae (residences) 38 m wide, connected by a square to the ancient Gate V. It is likely that they were built re-using structures belonging to the sacred area of the Olympeion. Nearby is a sanctuary with an L-shaped portico from the early 5th century BC, which is annexed to Gate V. In the area are also two archaic (mid-6th century BC) temples.

On the northern side of Gate V is a large stone square leading to the "Sanctuary of the Chthonic Gods".

The structure known as the "Oratory of Phalaris" is in fact a Roman temple, measuring 12.40 × 8.85 m.

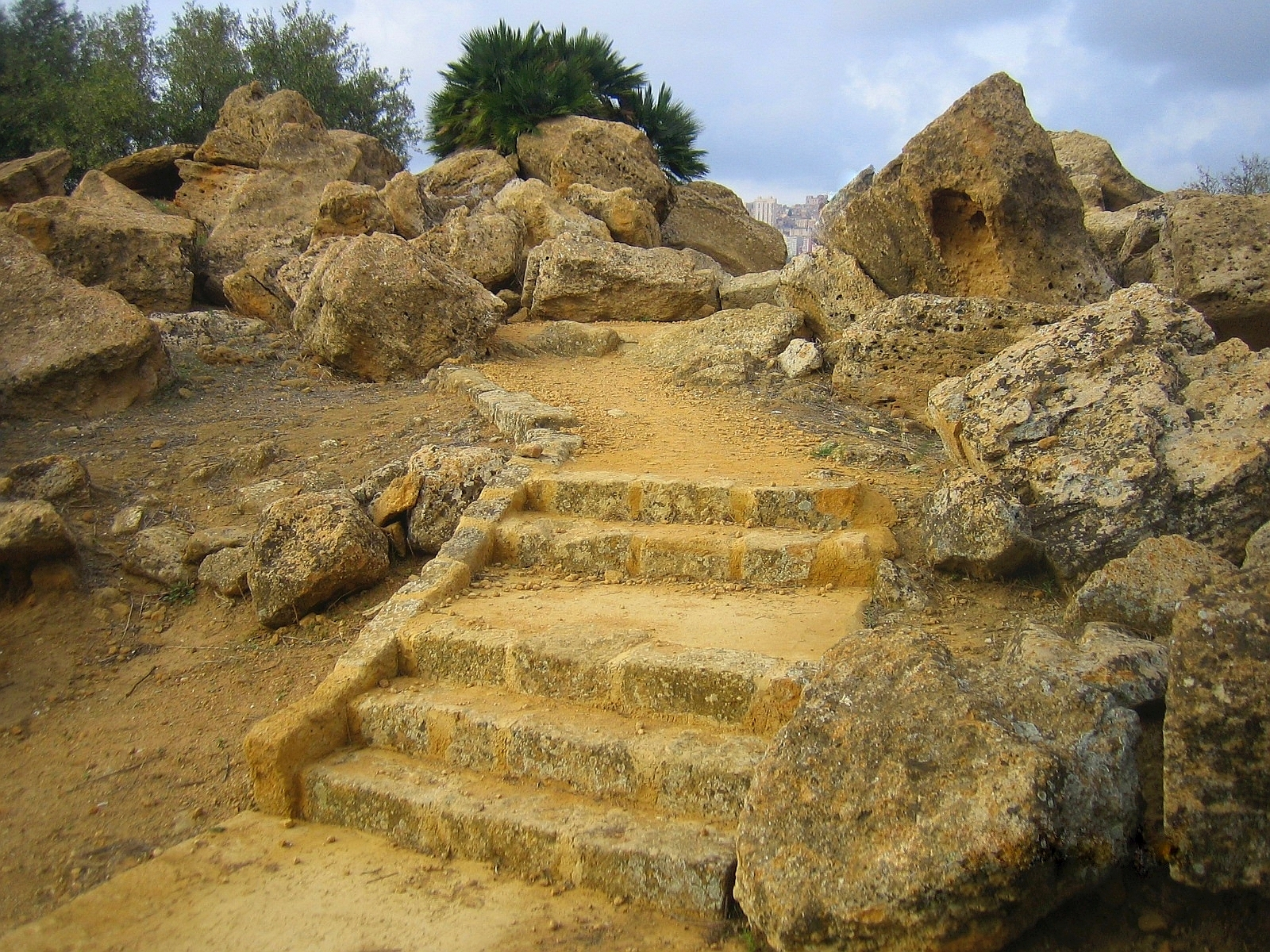
Temple of Zeus

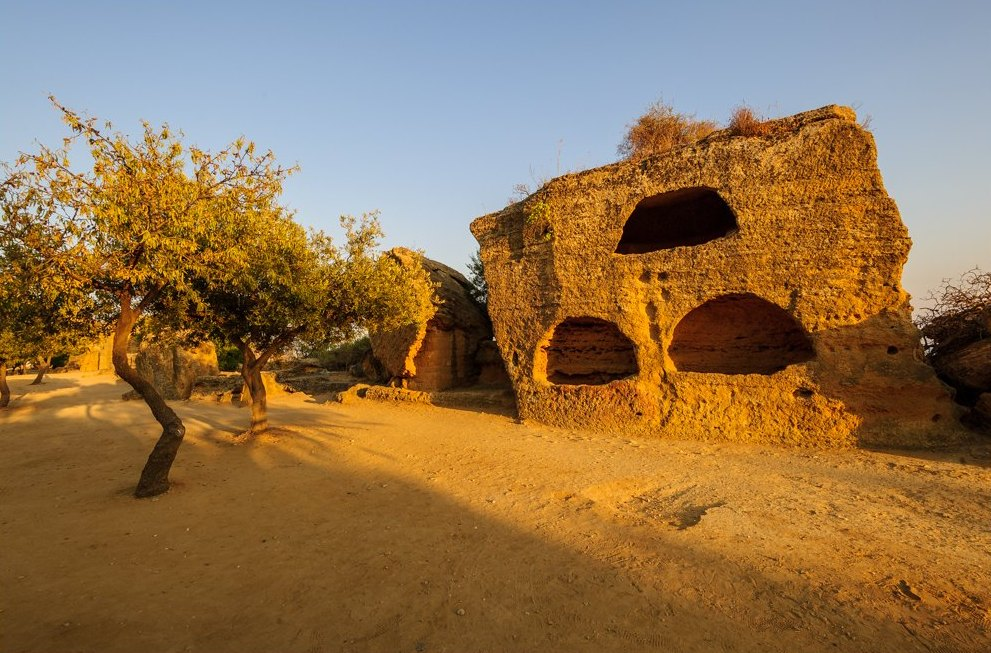

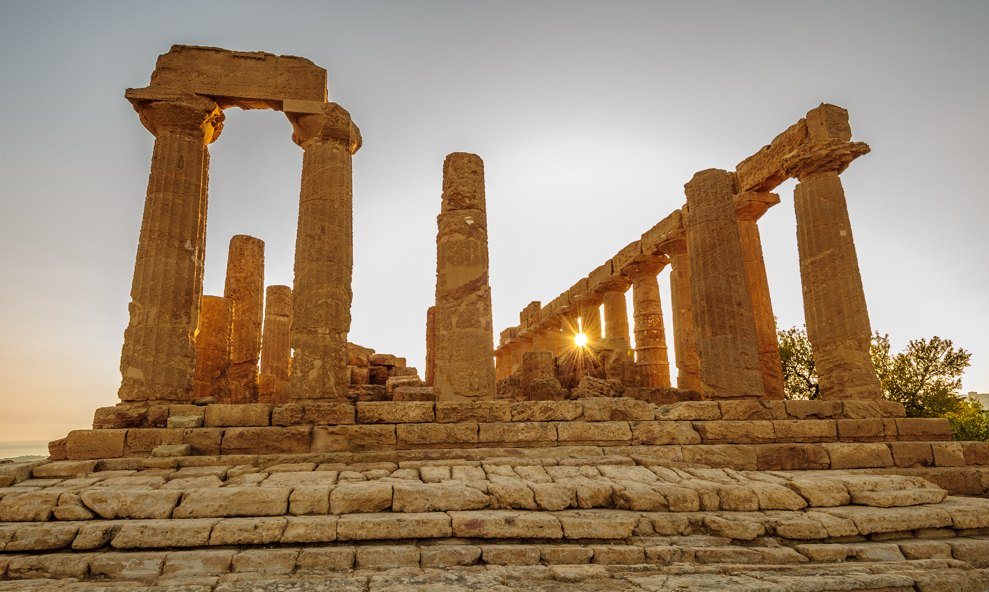
Temple of "Hera"

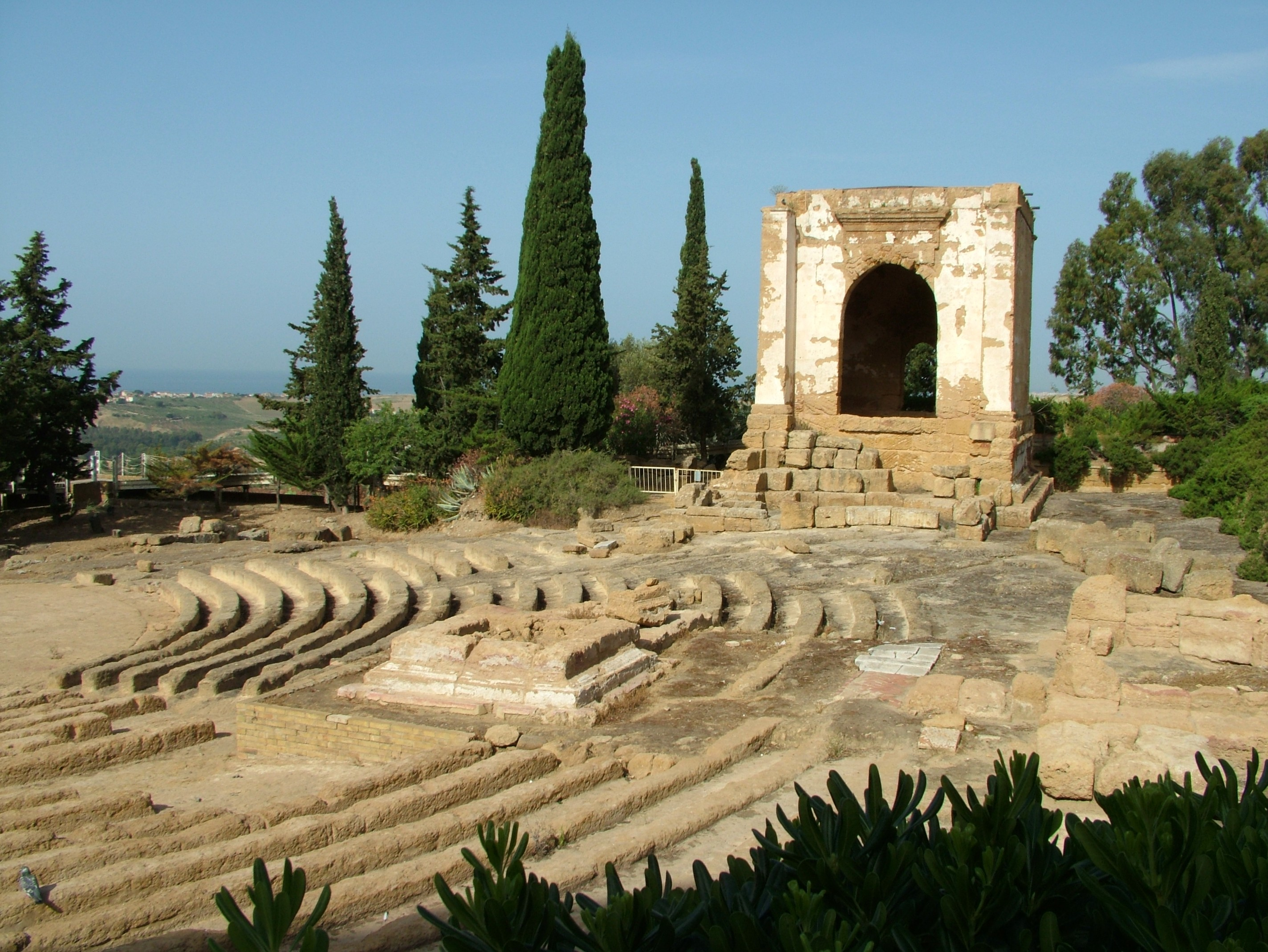
Greek Bouleuterion

== Excavations ==
Much of the excavation and restoration of the temples was due to the efforts of archaeologist Domenico Antonio Lo Faso Pietrasanta (1783–1863), who was the Duke of Serradifalco from 1809 through 1812. During the 20th century, the archeological excavation was mainly funded by Captain Alexander Hardcastle. He permitted excavations within the archaeological park including the straightening of the eight columns on the south side of the Temple of Heracles. For his contributions to archaeology, he was made an honorary citizen of the city of Agrigento and was granted in 1928 the rank of Commander of the Order of the Crown of Italy. Recently, archaeologists from the Free University of Berlin have been carrying out important excavations at the Agrigento site.

== See also ==
- Architecture of Ancient Greece
- Greek temple
- List of Greco-Roman roofs
