= Temple of Heracles, Agrigento =

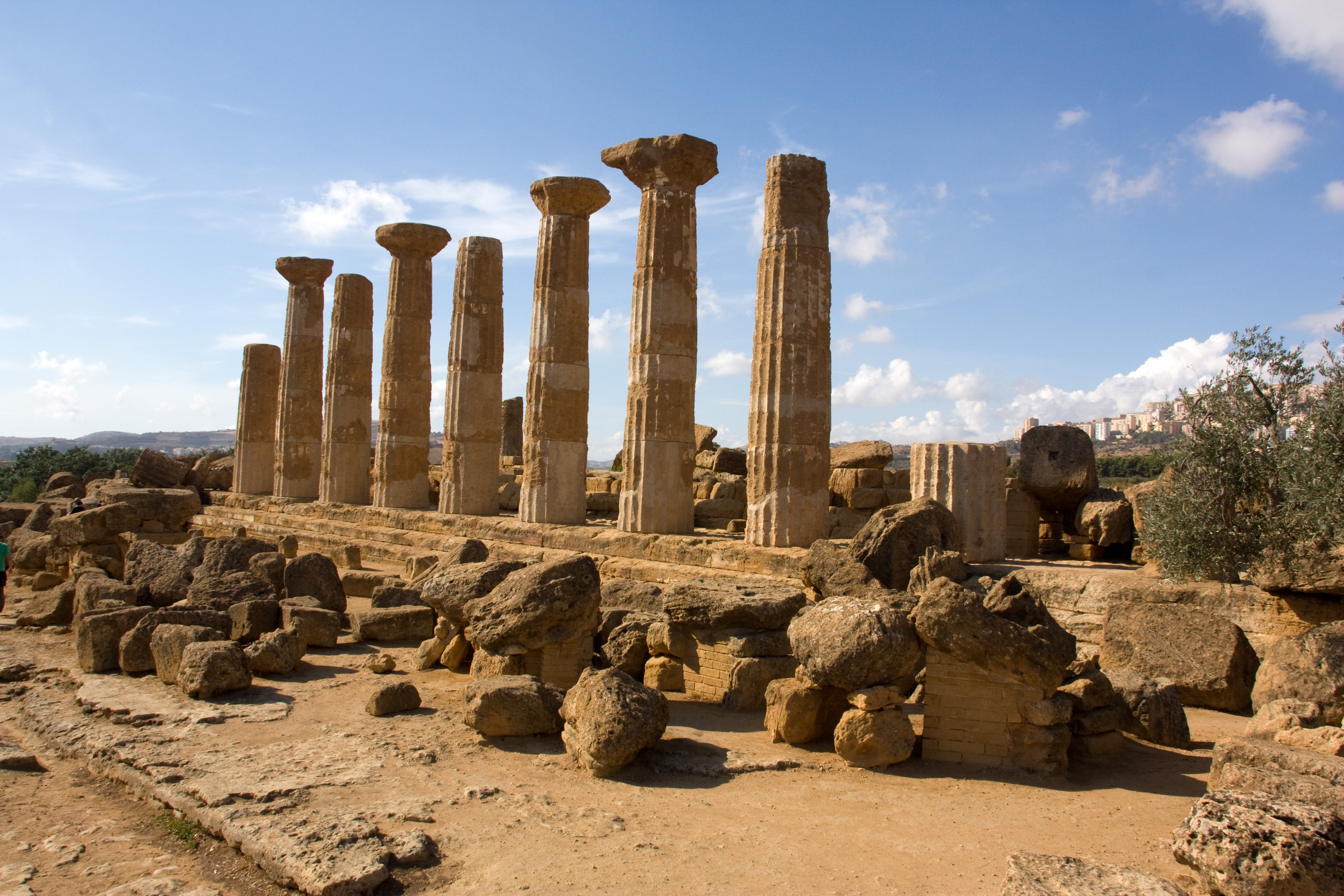
- Columns of the Temple of Heracles

General information
- Location: Agrigento, Sicily
- Coordinates: 37°17′25″N 13°35′11″E

The Temple of Heracles or Temple of Hercules (the Roman name of the hero) is an ancient Greek temple of Magna Graecia in the ancient city of Akragas, located in the Valle dei Templi in Agrigento, Italy.

The building, in the archaic Doric style, is found on what is known as the hill of the temples, on a rocky spur near Villa Aurea. The name Temple of Heracles is an attribution of modern scholarship, based on Cicero's mention of a temple dedicated to the hero non longe a foro "not far from the agora" (Verrine II 4.94), containing a famous statue of Heracles. That the agora of Akragas was in this area has not yet been demonstrated, but the identification is generally accepted.

The excavation of the site was carried out mostly in the 19^{th} century, with the archaeologist Domenico Antonio Lo Faso Pietrasanta in charge

This temple is located approximately one kilometer to the west of Temple of Concordia.

== History ==
The traditionally accepted chronology of the temple identifies it as the most ancient of the Greek Akragantine temples, dating to the final years of the 6th century BC. This dating is based on stylistic characteristics, especially its proportions, number of columns, and the profile of the columns and of their capitals. This time period lines up with the tyrant Phalaris (ruled 570 to 554 BC), in the era archeologists call the Phalarian architectural period.

However, some connect the temple with the activities of Theron (Tyrant of Akragas 488-473/2 BC), claiming that it contains innovations compared to the architectural practice of the 6th century. In that case, it could be identified with the temple of Athena recorded by Polyaenus (Stratagems 6.51) in relation to the building activities of Theron after his seizure of power.

The remains of the entablature constitute a problem for dating, because there are two types of cymatium with gutters and lion heads: the first, less well-preserved than the other, datable to the 460s BC and the second datable to around the middle of the fifth century. Probably the first cymatium is the original and was replaced by the second a few decades later (for reasons unknown). The temple's foundation is considered to be dated to the years before the Battle of Himera (480 BC); its completion would have taken a decade or maybe a little more.

The building was restored in the Roman period with some modifications. The naos was divided into three, which could indicate a dedication to multiple divinities. If still in use by the 4th and 5th centuries, it would have been closed during the persecution of pagans in the late Roman Empire.

In the 20th century, restorers have reconstructed nine of the columns on the southeastern side through anastylosis. In addition, they restored part of the entablature and some of the capitals.

== Architecture ==
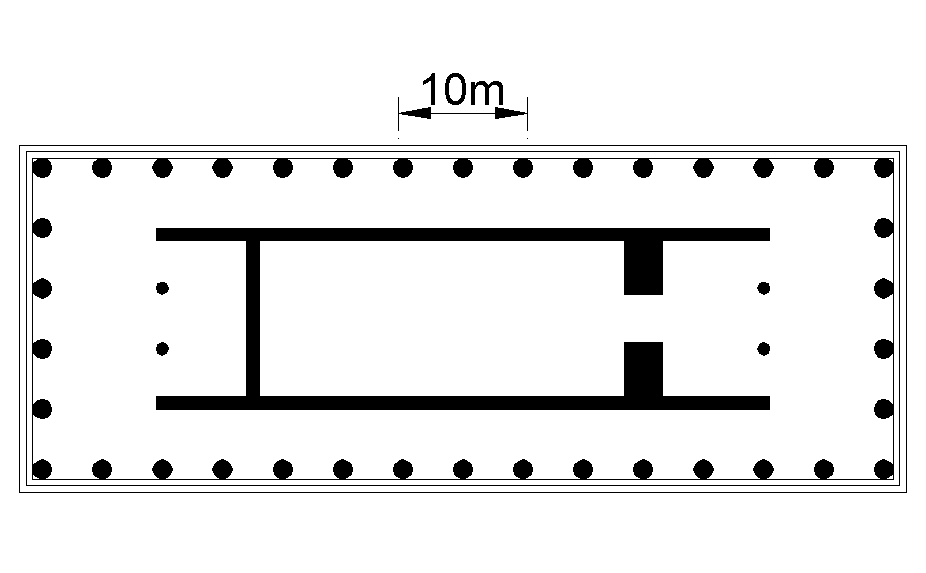
Floor plan

The building was constructed on a crepidoma of three steps, which was erected on top of a substructure on the northern and western sides (due to the roughness of the terrain). It is a peripteros temple of unusually elongated proportions (67 metres long and 25.34 meters wide), with six columns along the front (hexastyle) and fifteen columns on the sides. Inside the peristasis is a long naos, bounded by a pronaos at the front and an opisthodomos at the back, both in antis. Their remains seem to indicate that the building was destroyed by an earthquake.

In the building's remains, internal stairs for the inspection of the roof can be seen in the walls between the pronaos and the naos. Such stairs became a typical feature of Akragantine temples. The tall columns are topped by wide capitals, with a deep gulf between the stem and the echinus. This feature might indicate the comparative antiquity of the building (predating the other peripteros temples at Akragas by at least thirty years), along with the elongation of the naos and the wide separation of the columns from the naos. On the eastern side of the temple are the remains of the large altar of the temple.

Akragas was designed around the temples. Most likely due to its founding being later in the colonization of Sicily, it was centered around religious life. Many of the temples are in the hills that surrounded the city, including the Temple of Heracles. The Temple of Heracles, along with the Temples of Concordia, Juno, Demeter and Vulcan, was used to help build the walls that were around the city. Many of these temples also acted as a entry-point for the city, with the Temple of Heracles located at Gate IV.

Angle contraction was also developed in this time and was first found in the Temple of Heracles. Angle contraction is when each of the four sides of the peristyle had their intercolumniation reduced. This helped get rid of any blank space at the end of the frieze.

The Temple of Heracles is oriented with the front of the temple facing east and could have been built to face the rising sun during the equinox.

== Culture ==
The temple was likely built as a place of sacred worship. Not only the other temples in the valley itself, but also through much of Sicily, there is evidence that these temples had sacred meaning. Archaeologist A. Pautasso found terracotta figures that were found in Sicilian sanctuaries and temples, that tie into the iconography and symbols that the people used as offerings. Several other sites in Sicily have evidence of religious rituals and religious groups, including in the same ancient city of Akragas. The Upper Sanctuary of Demeter has a ton of material finds, from terracotta items to a large number of bronze offerings. In the Valley of Temples there are temples dedicated to Zeus, Heracles, Juno and Concordia. During excavation, a marble depicting the torso of a struggling figure was also found at the Temple of Heracles. Ernesto De Miro found what he assumed to be the matching helmeted head.

The link between Heracles and the temple can also be disputed, with inscriptions on the seats of the gymnasium being dedicated to Heracles and Hermes, and the proximity of the two structures. A small saecellum inside the temple can explain the idea that the temple could have been dedicated to Apollo, the Hellenic god of music, poetry and archery. Due to the worship and increased popularity of Aesclepius, Apollo’s son. The statue found in the side room of the temple has been associated with Aesclepius, furthering the claim. However, several timelines and dimensions do not match up, with the base of the statue being incompatible with the area within the temple. A shrine found at the end of the cella is dated much after the rest of the temple and can be connected with the idea the statue was also added later.

== See also ==
- List of Ancient Greek temples
