= Temple of Hera, Agrigento =

Greek temple in Sicily, Italy

Coordinates: 37.2886°N 13.6002°E

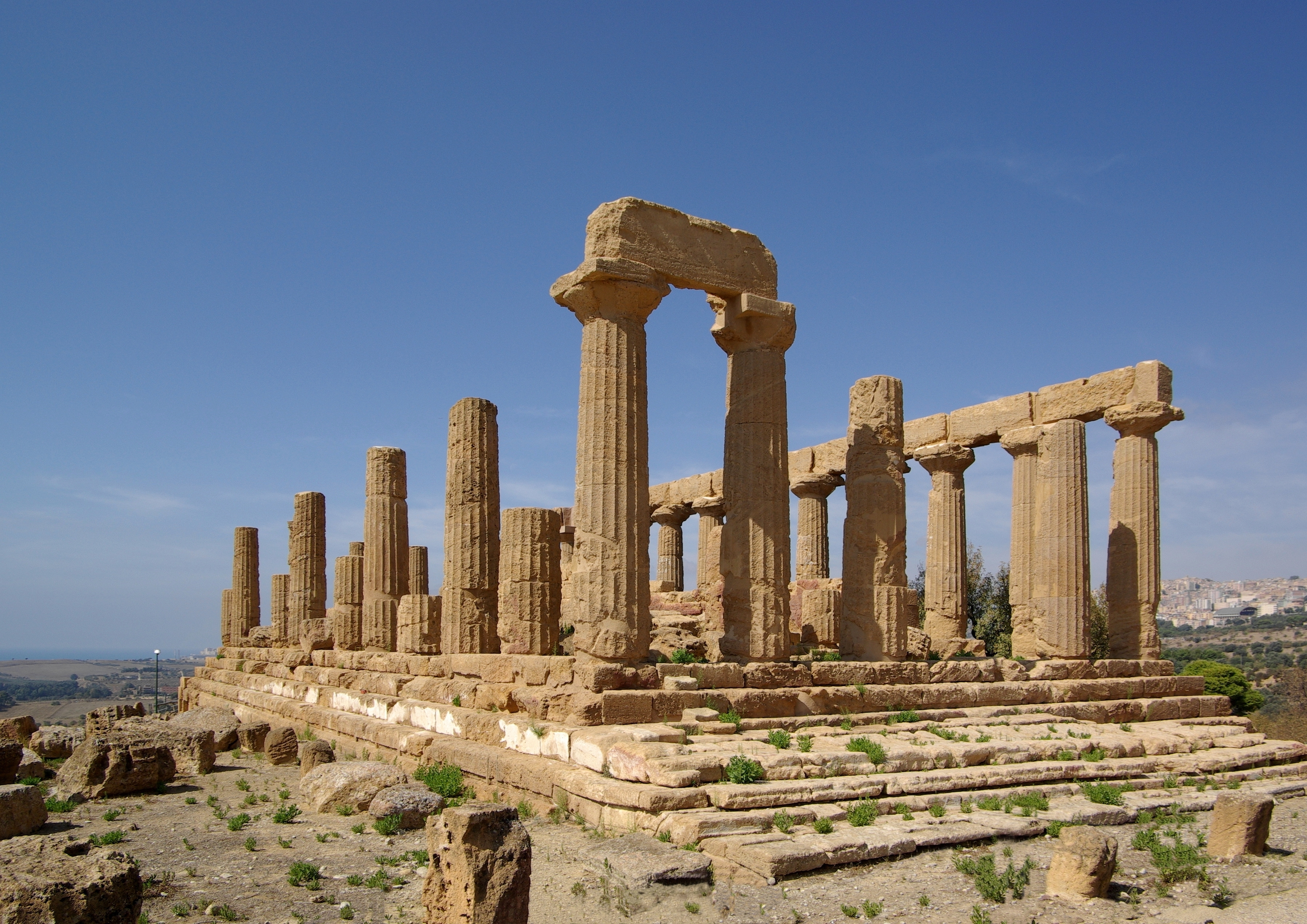
Temple "D", Agrigento

The so-called Temple of "Hera" (or Roman Juno), otherwise known as Temple D, is a Greek temple in the Valle dei Templi, a section of the ancient city of Agrigentum (ancient Greek Akragas, modern Agrigento) in Sicily.

Its attribution to Hera derives from a misinterpretation of a passage by the Roman writer Pliny the Elder, which actually refers to the temple of Hera on the Lacinio promontory near Crotone, Calabria.

It was built about the year 450 BC and in period and in style belongs to the Archaic Doric period. Signs of a fire which followed the Siege of Akragas and the Carthaginian sack of the city of 406 BC have been detected.

The temple was restored in the era of the Roman province of Sicily, with the original terracotta roof being replaced by one of marble, with a more steeply inclined slope on the eastern side.

== Description ==
The building is a peripterotic Doric temple, with six columns on the short sides (hexastyle) and thirteen on the long sides, according to a canon derived from the models of the Greek homeland and also used for its "twin", the Temple of Concordia, with which it shares general dimensions. The temple's floor plan is around 38 x 16.9 m.

The front columns differ slightly in width, tapering at the ends and swelling at their middles. The peristyle of thirty-four 6.4 metre-high columns, each formed from four stacked drums, rests on a crepidoma of four steps. The whole edifice is on a raised, largely artificial, spur. In front of the eastern face are notable remains of the ancient altar.

The interior is composed of a cella, with no internal colonnade, of the double antis type, with its pronaos at the front mirrored by the opisthodomos at the back, both framed by two ranks of columns (distyle). Two stairs for the inspection of the roof, or perhaps for religious purposes, were built into the wall separating the naos from the pronaos.

The northern colonnade with the architrave and part of the frieze is completely preserved, while the colonnades on the other three sides are only partly surviving, with four columns missing and nine severely damaged, and they almost entirely lack their architraves. Some small elements of the naos remain, mostly the foundations of its exterior walls. The building has been restored using anastylosis since the eighteenth century.

== Bibliography ==
- Robertson, D. S. (1969). Greek and Roman Architecture. United Kingdom: Cambridge University Press.
- Akragas, The Princeton Encyclopaedia of Classical Sites (edited by Richard Stillwell, William L. MacDonald, Marian Holland McAllister) Princeton University Press. 1976.
