= List of ancient Greek and Roman roofs =

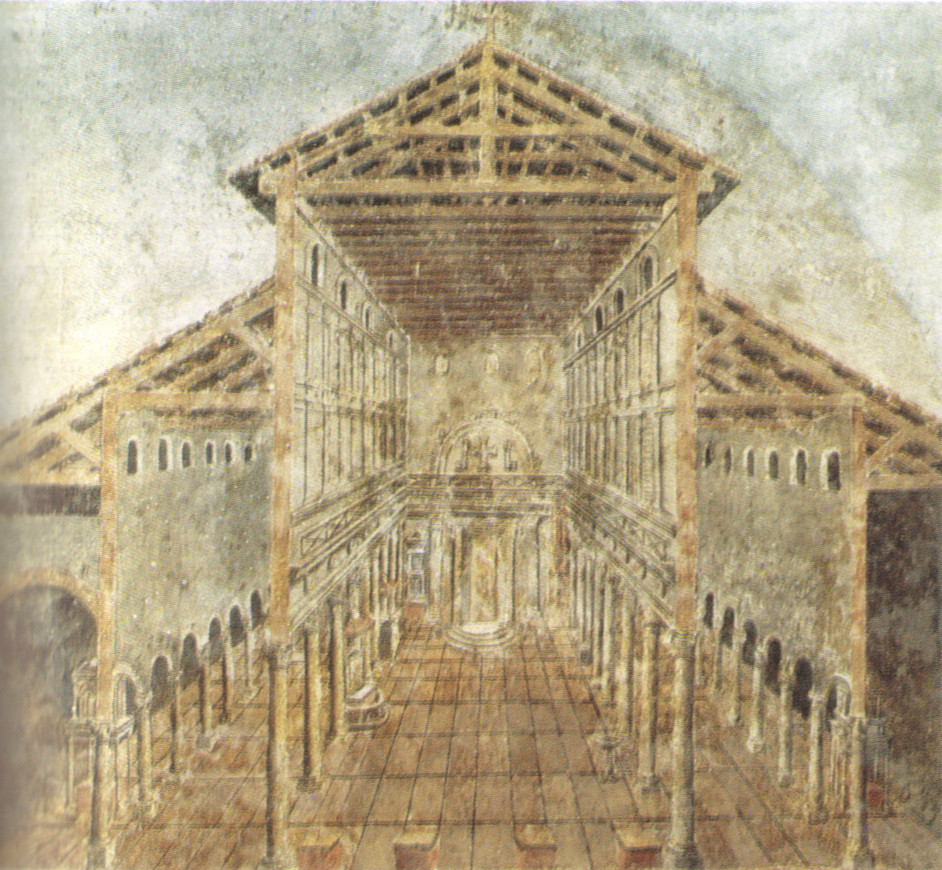
The truss roof of the 4th-century church Old St. Peter's Basilica, Rome. The triangular frame of beams of the main nave is largely self-supporting, as the forces are carried along the beams rather than acting vertically on them.

The list of ancient roofs comprises roof constructions from Greek and Roman architecture, ordered by clear span. Roof constructions increased in clear span as Greek and Roman engineering improved. Most buildings in classical Greece were covered by traditional prop-and-lintel constructions, which often required interior colonnades for support. In Sicily, truss roofs are believed to have appeared as early as 550 BC. Their potential was fully realized during the Roman Empire, which saw trussed roofs spanning over 30 meters in width, covering the rectangular spaces of monumental public buildings such as temples, basilicas, and later churches. These spans were three times as large as the widest prop-and-lintel roofs and were only exceeded by the largest Roman domes.

Almost no original classical roofs survive. The two best known exceptions, both circular or nearly so, are the small stone roof of the Tower of the Winds in Athens (perhaps 1st century BC) and the large Roman concrete roof of the Pantheon, Rome.

== Greek roofing ==
List of ancient Greek monuments by descending largest clear span
Image	Monument	Location	Region	Date	Type of roof	Width between cella walls	Clear span between colonnades	Largest clear span
	Temple of Olympian Zeus (or Olympeion)	Agrigento	Sicily		Truss	12.85	–	12.85
	Temple of Heracles	Agrigento	Sicily	5th century BC, early	Truss	11.84	–	11.84
	Temple E	Selinunte	Sicily	480/70 BC	Truss	11.70	–	11.70
	Parthenon	Athens	Greece		Prop-and-lintel	19.20	11.05	11.05
	S. Biagio	Agrigento	Sicily		Truss	10.35	–	10.35
	Athene	Syracuse	Sicily		Truss	9.82	–	9.82
	Erechtheion	Athens	Greece		Prop-and-lintel	9.80	–	9.80
	Treasury of Gela	Olympia	Greece		Truss	9.68	–	9.68
	Temple of Athena Alea	Tegea	Greece		Prop-and-lintel	8.94	–	8.94
	Temple of Zeus	Olympia	Greece		Prop-and-lintel	13.26	8.52	8.52
	Temple C	Selinunte	Sicily	550 BC	Truss	8.50	–	8.50
	Megaron	Gaggera	Sicily		Truss	8.47	–	8.47
	Athenians	Delos	Greece		Prop-and-lintel	8.34	–	8.34
	Temple D	Selinunte	Sicily	540 BC	Truss	8.20	–	8.20
	Temple of Hera	Agrigento	Sicily		Truss	7.68	–	7.68
	Temple of Concordia	Agrigento	Sicily		Prop-and-lintel	7.55	–	7.55
	Temple A	Selinunte	Sicily		Truss	7.50	–	7.50
	Temple of Apollo	Delphi	Greece		Prop-and-lintel	10.72	7.32	7.32
	Temple G	Selinunte	Sicily		Truss	17.93	7.15	7.15
	Temple F	Selinunte	Sicily	530 BC	Truss	7.12	–	7.12
	Temple of Isthmia	Isthmia	Greece		Prop-and-lintel	11.7	~7.0	~7.0
	Temple of Poseidon	Sounion	Greece		Prop-and-lintel	6.53	–	6.53
	Heraion	At the mouth of the Sele River near Paestum	Italy, Lower		Prop-and-lintel	6.14	–	6.14
	Artemis	Kalydon	Greece		Prop-and-lintel	6.14	?	6.14
	Kardaki Temple	Corfu	Greece		Prop-and-lintel	~6.0	–	~6.0
	Second Temple of Hera	Paestum	Italy, Lower	480/70 BC	Prop-and-lintel	10.85	5.9	5.9
	Temple of Athena/Ceres	Paestum	Italy, Lower		Prop-and-lintel	5.70	–	5.70
	Apollo	Delos	Greece		Prop-and-lintel	5.70	–	5.70
	Basilica	Paestum	Italy, Lower	550–10 BC	Prop-and-lintel	11.44	5.6	5.6
	Tavole Palatine	Metapontum	Italy, Lower			5.60	–	5.60
	Bouleuterion (S)	Olympia	Greece		Prop-and-lintel	11.07	5.53	5.53
	Bouleuterion (N)	Olympia	Greece		Prop-and-lintel	10.80	5.40	5.40
	Temple of Apollo	Bassae	Greece		Prop-and-lintel	6.81	5.23	5.23
	Rhamnous	Attica	Greece		Prop-and-lintel	5.17	–	5.17
	Metroon	Olympia	Greece		Prop-and-lintel	5.08	–	5.08
	Temple of Hera	Olympia	Greece		Prop-and-lintel	8.37	4.84	4.84
	Temple of Hephaestus (or Theseion)	Athens	Greece		Prop-and-lintel	6.24	4.74	4.74
	Artemis	Corcyra	Greece		Prop-and-lintel	7.37	4.1	4.1
	Temple of Asclepius	Epidauros	Greece		Prop-and-lintel	3.95	–	3.95
	Temple of Aphaia	Aegina	Greece		Prop-and-lintel	6.28	3.85	3.85
	Apollo	Syracuse	Sicily		Truss	9.70	3.6	3.6
	Apollo	Corinth	Greece		Prop-and-lintel	8.47	3.45	3.45

== Roman roofing ==
List of Roman monuments by descending clear span
Image	Monument	Location	Region	Date	Type of roof	Clear span
	Throne room of the Flavian Palace	Rome	Italy, Central	92 AD	Truss	31.67
	Roman Theatre	Aosta	Italy, Upper	Augustan	Truss	30.49
	Diribitorium	Rome	Italy, Central	7 BC	Truss	29.60?
	Coenatio Iovis	Rome	Italy, Central	92 AD	Truss	29.30
	Constantine's Basilica	Trier	Germany	300 AD	Truss	26.05
	Odeon of Agrippa	Athens	Greece	15 BC	Truss	25.75
	Temple of Venus and Roma	Rome	Italy, Central	135 AD	Truss	25.75
	Basilica Ulpia	Rome	Italy, Central	113 AD	Truss	25.16
	Basilica of Saint Paul Outside the Walls	Rome	Italy, Central	385 AD	Truss	24.27
	Old St. Peter's Basilica	Rome	Italy, Central	330 AD	Truss	23.68

== See also ==
- Record-holding roofs in antiquity
- Ancient Greek architecture
- Ancient Roman architecture
- List of Ancient Greek temples

== Sources ==
- Hodge, A. Trevor (1960), The Woodwork of Greek Roofs, Cambridge University Press, pp. 38–44
- Ulrich, Roger B. (2007), Roman Woodworking, Yale University Press, ISBN 978-0-300-10341-0
