= Temple of Concordia, Agrigento =

Ancient temple in Agrigento, Italy

Temple of Concordia
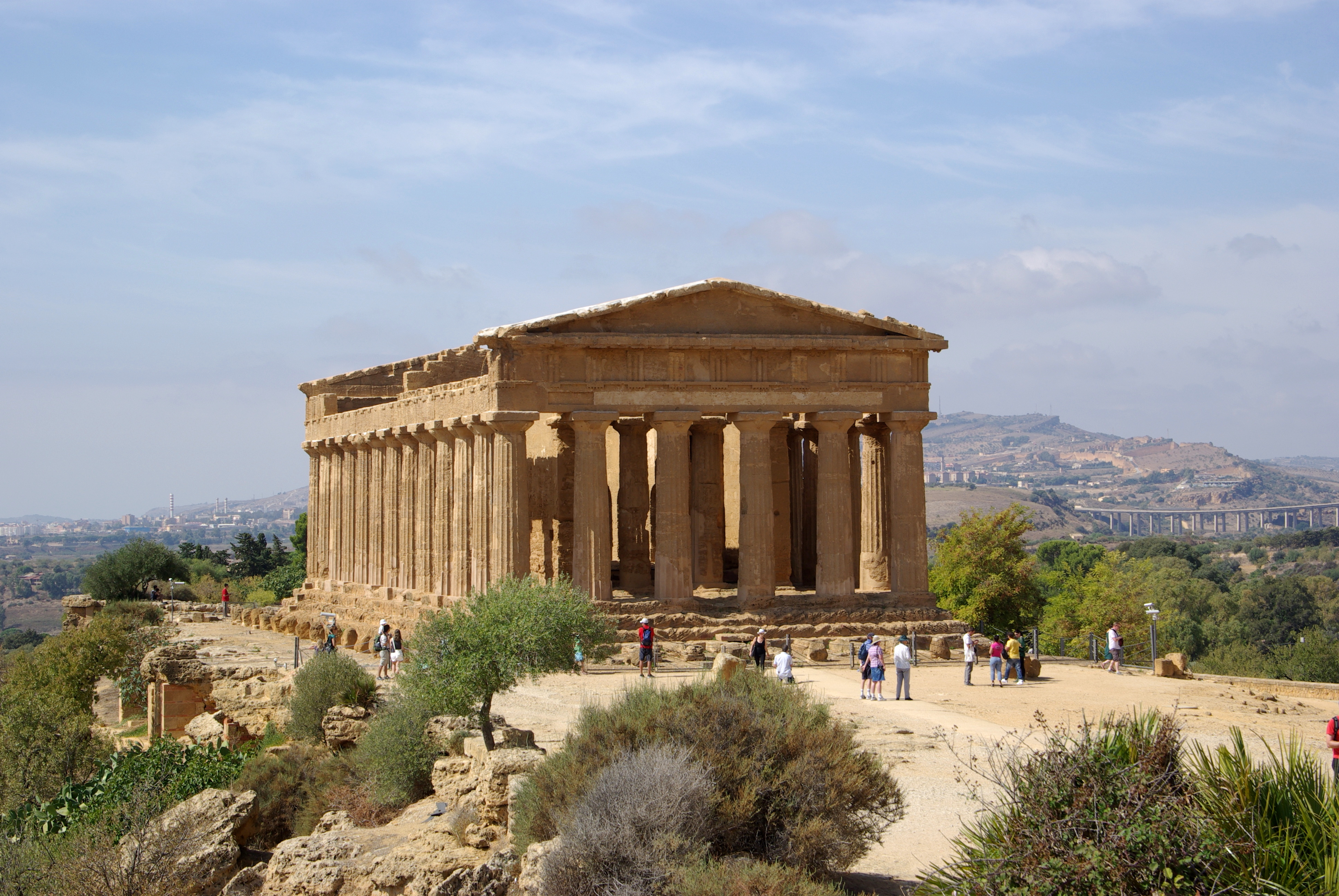
- Interactive map of the Temple of Concordia area
- Alternative names: Temple of Concord

General information
- Architectural style: Ancient Greek
- Location: Agrigento, Sicily, Italy
- Coordinates: 37°17′23″N 13°35′31″E
- Completed: c. 440-430 BC
- Renovated: 1785
- Affiliation: Christian church (6th century-1785)

Height
- Height: 8.93 m (29.3 ft)

Dimensions
- Other dimensions: 39.42 m × 16.92 m (129.3 ft × 55.5 ft)

The Temple of Concordia (Italian: Tempio della Concordia; Greek: Ναός της Ομόνοιας) is an ancient Greek temple of Magna Graecia in the Valle dei Templi (Valley of the Temples) in Agrigento (Greek: Ακράγας, romanized: Akragas) on the south coast of Sicily, Italy. It is the largest and best-preserved Doric temple in Sicily and one of the best-preserved Greek temples in general, especially of the Doric order. It is located a kilometer east to the Temple of Heracles.

== Description ==
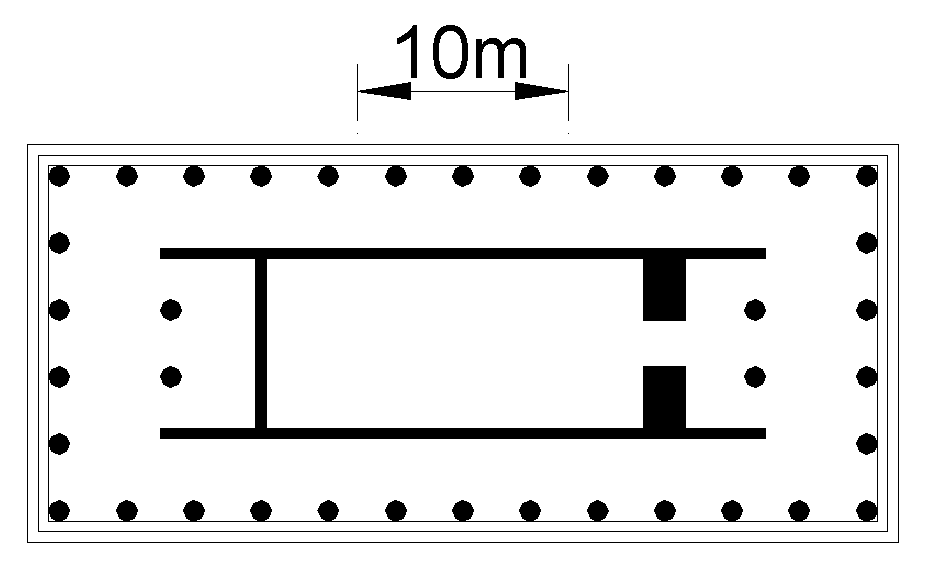
Floor plan of the temple

The temple was built c. 440–430 BC. The well-preserved peristasis of six by thirteen columns stands on a crepidoma of four steps (measuring 39.42 m × 16.92 m (129.3 ft × 55.5 ft), and 8.93 m (29.3 ft) high) The cella measures 28.36 m × 9.4 m (93.0 ft × 30.8 ft). The columns are 6 m (20 ft) high and carved with twenty flutes and harmonious entasis (tapering at the tops of the columns and swelling around the middles).

It is constructed, like the nearby Temple of Juno, on a solid base designed to overcome the unevenness of the rocky terrain. It has been conventionally named after Concordia, the Roman goddess of harmony, for the Roman-era Latin inscription found nearby, which is unrelated to it.

The temple was converted into a Christian basilica in the 6th century dedicated to the apostles Peter and Paul by San Gregorio delle Rape, bishop of Agrigento and thus survived the destruction of pagan places of worship. The spaces between the columns were filled with walling, altering its Classical Greek form. The division between the cella, the main room where the cult statue would have stood in antiquity, and the opisthodomos, an adjoining room, was destroyed, and the walls of the cella were cut into a series of arches along the nave. The Christian refurbishments were removed during the restoration of 1785. According to another source, the Prince of Torremuzza transferred the altar elsewhere and began restoration of the classic building in 1788.

According to authors of a 2007 article, it is "apart from the Parthenon, the best preserved Doric temple in the world."

== Gallery ==
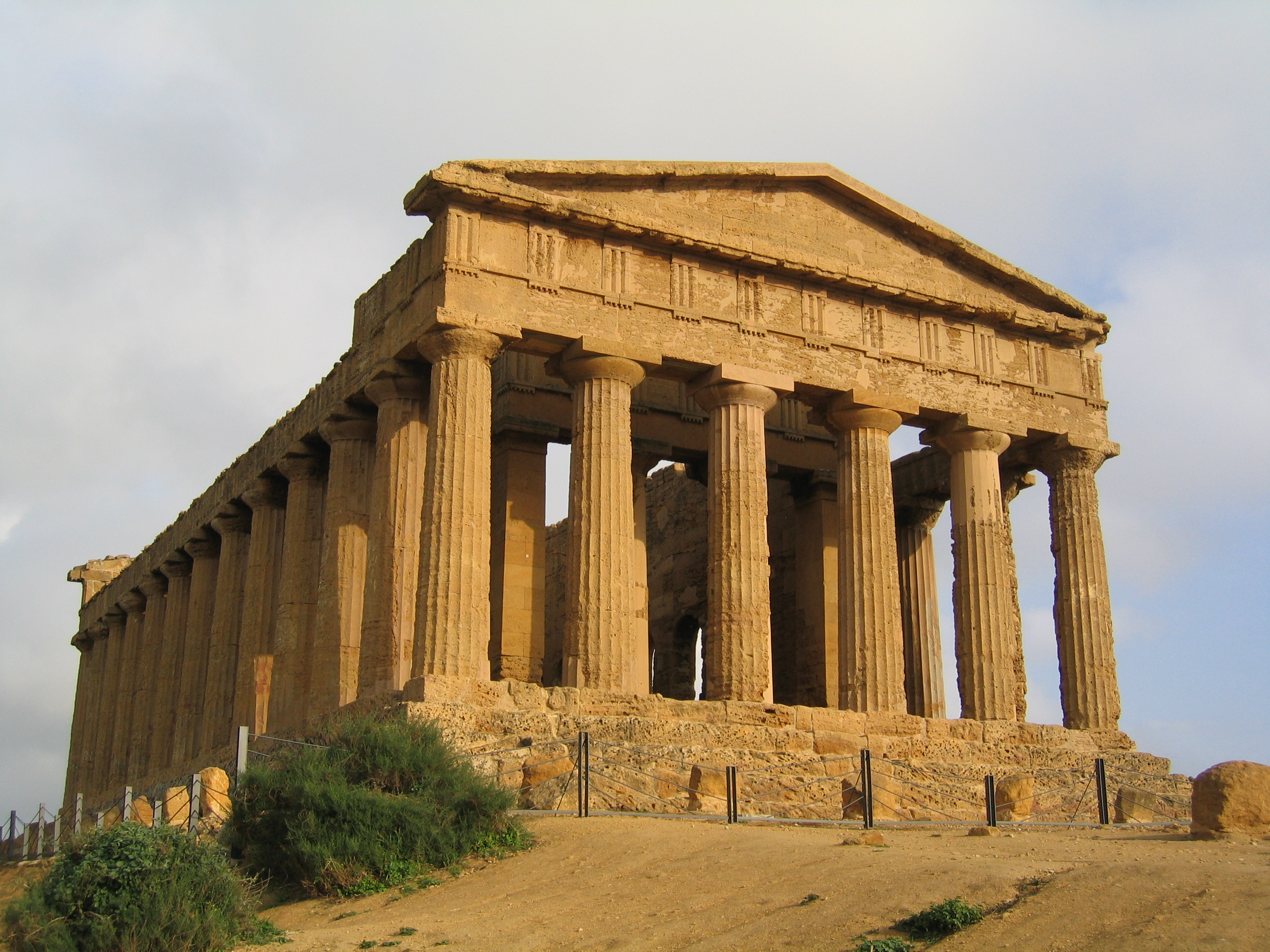

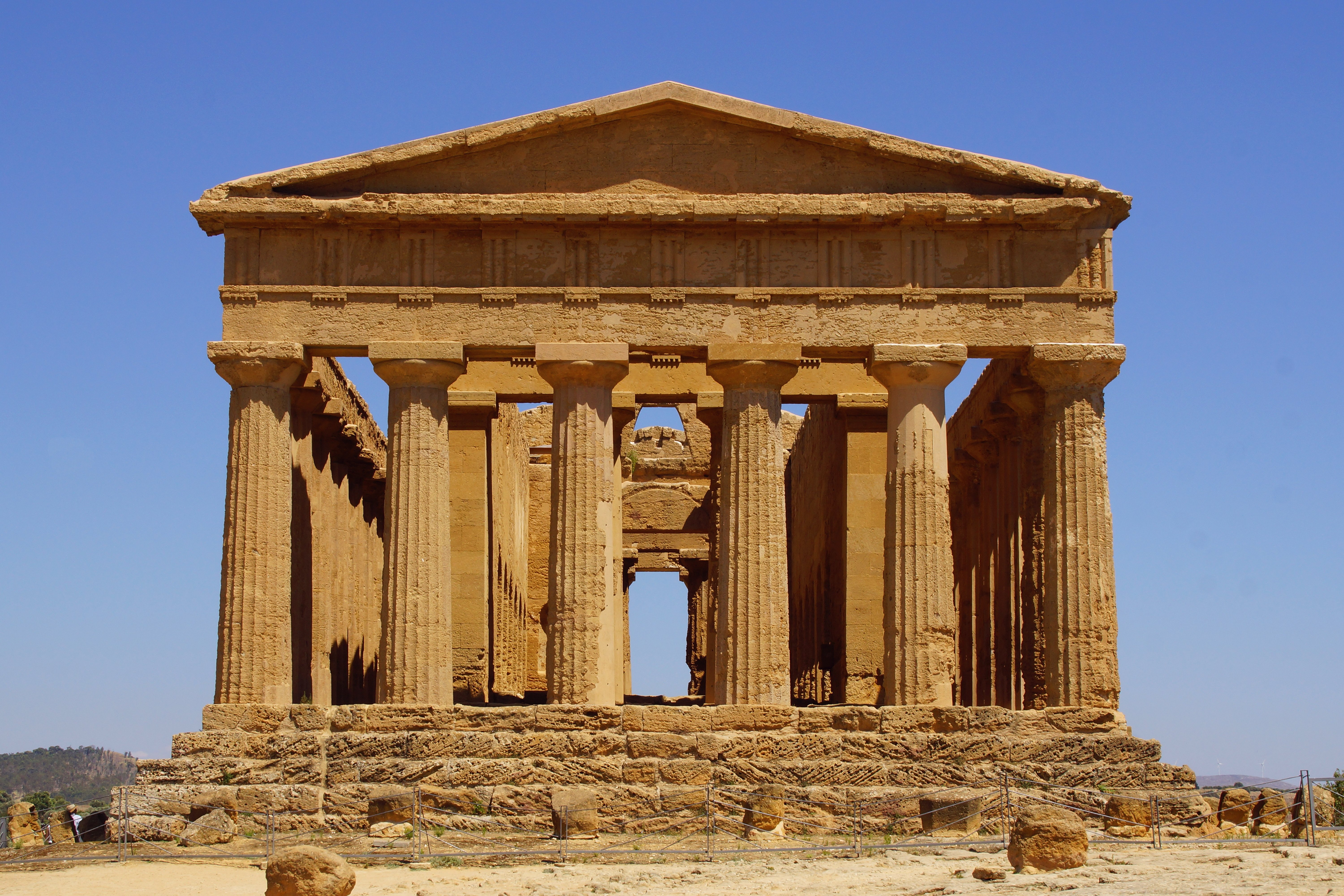

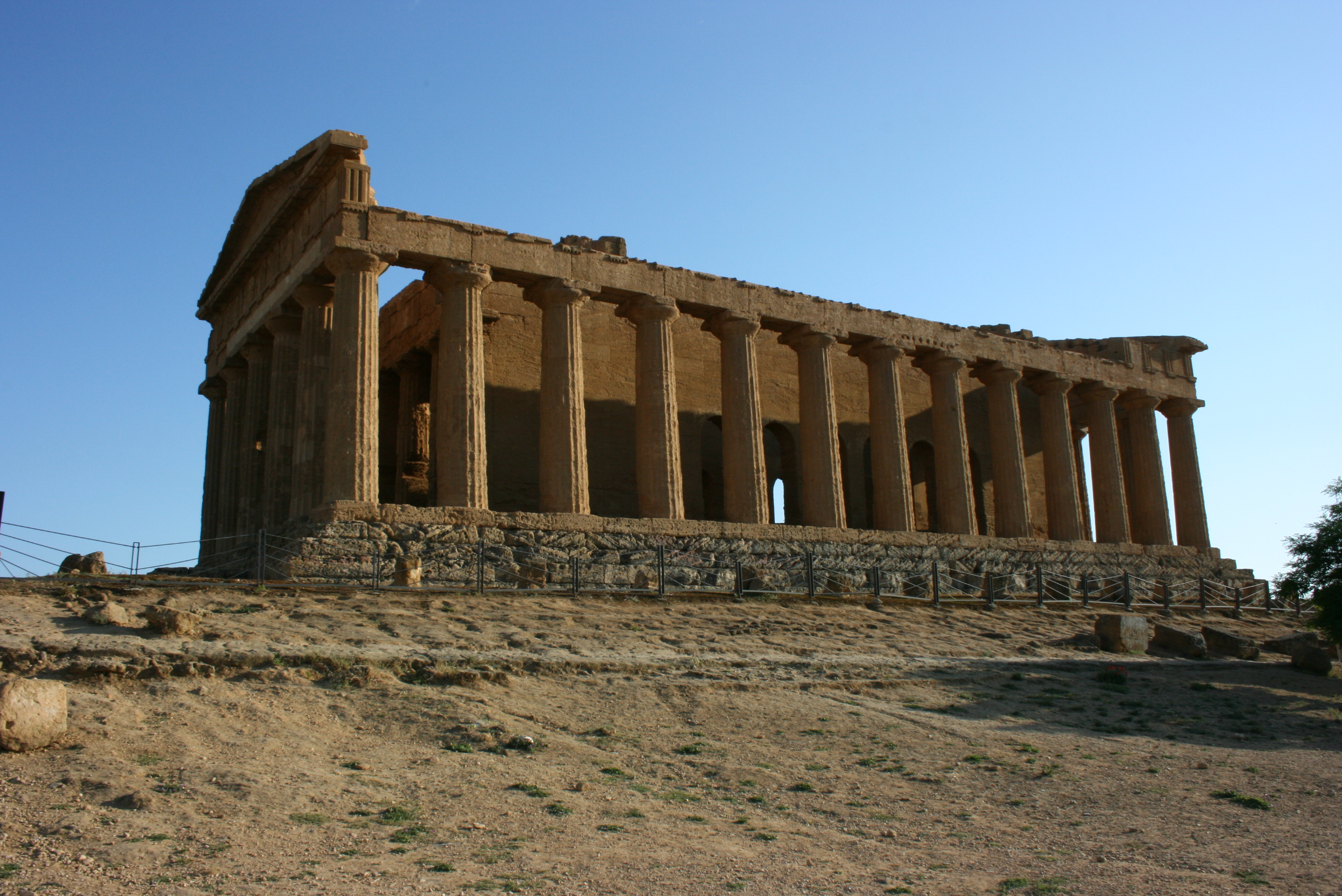

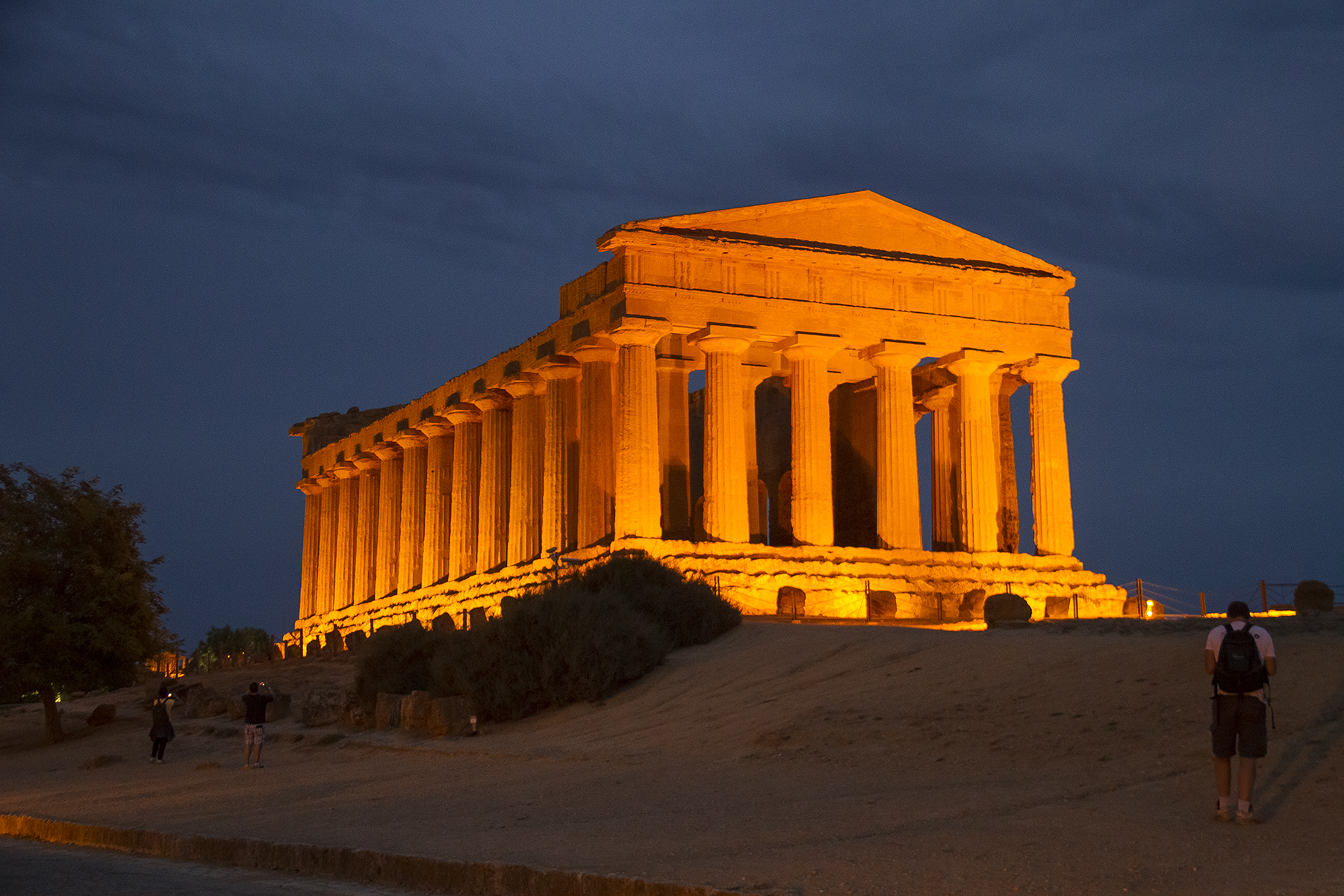
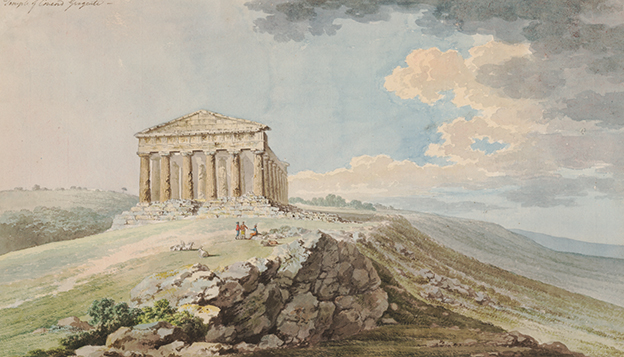
View of the Temple of Concord at Agrigentum by Charles Gore (1777)

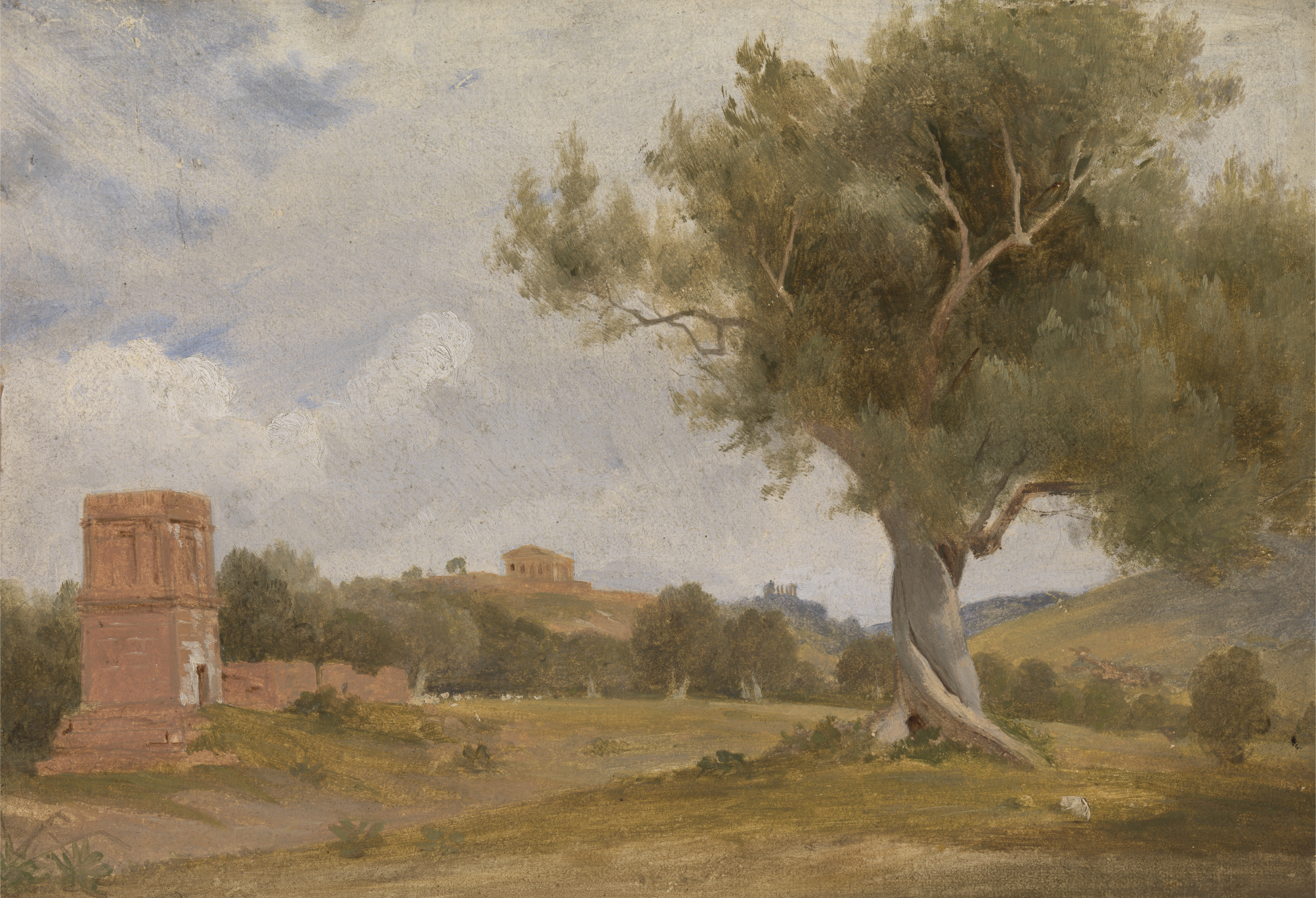
A View at Girgenti in Sicily with the Temple of Concord and Juno by Charles Lock Eastlake (c. 1818)

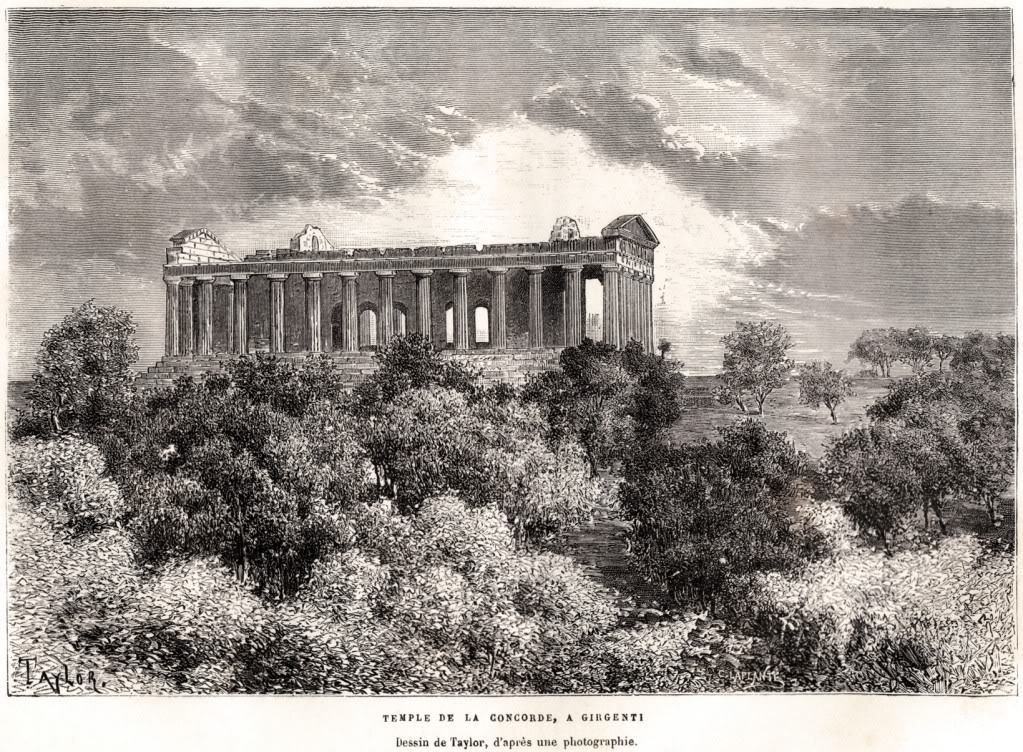
Temple of Concord at Girgenti, a wood engraved print (c. 1885)

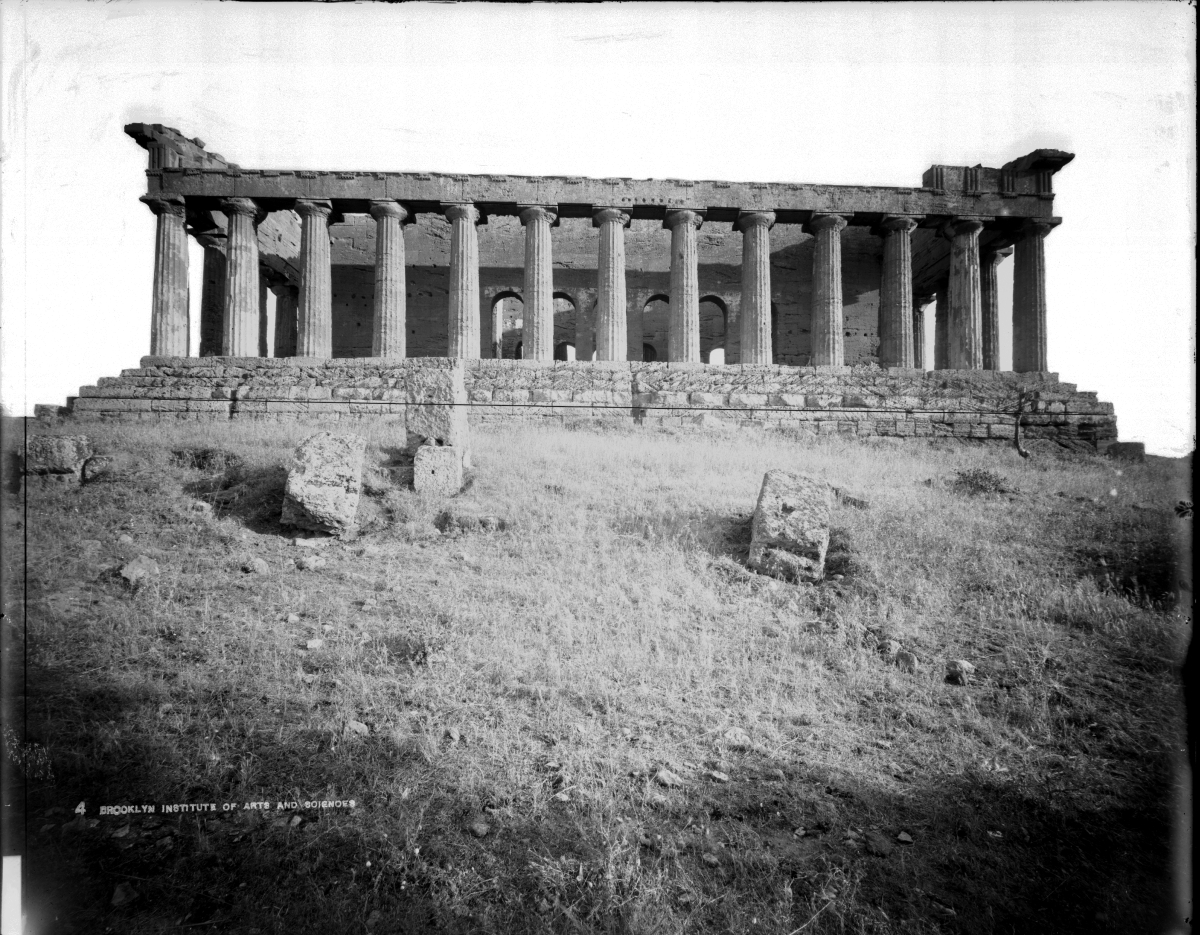
Temple of Concord, Girgenti by William Henry Goodyear (1895)

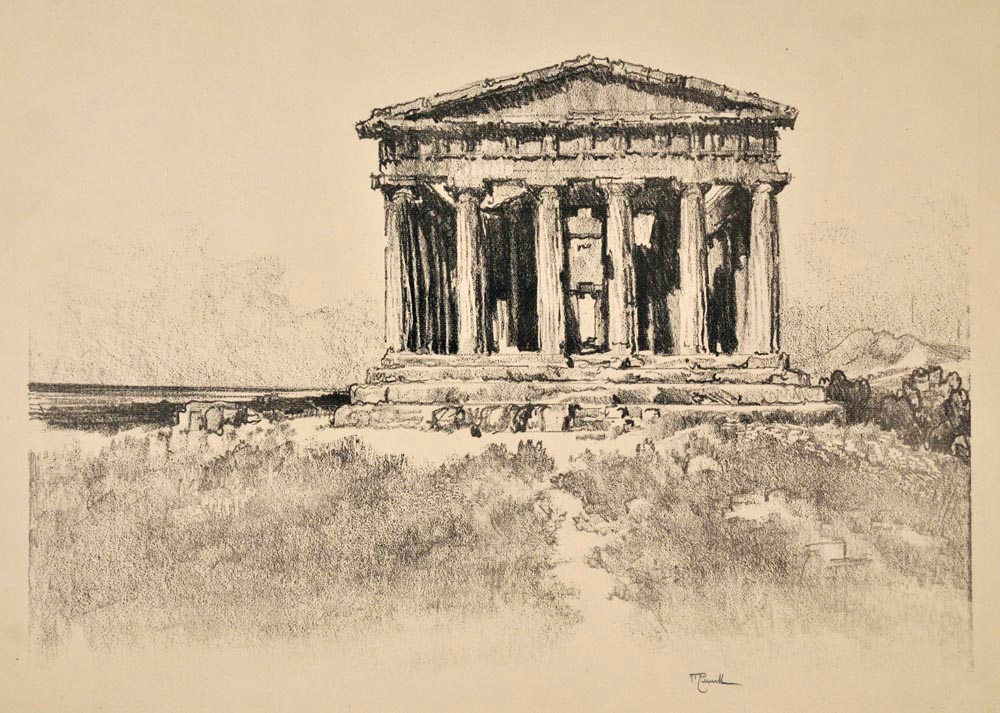
The Temple by the Sea by Joseph Pennell (1913)

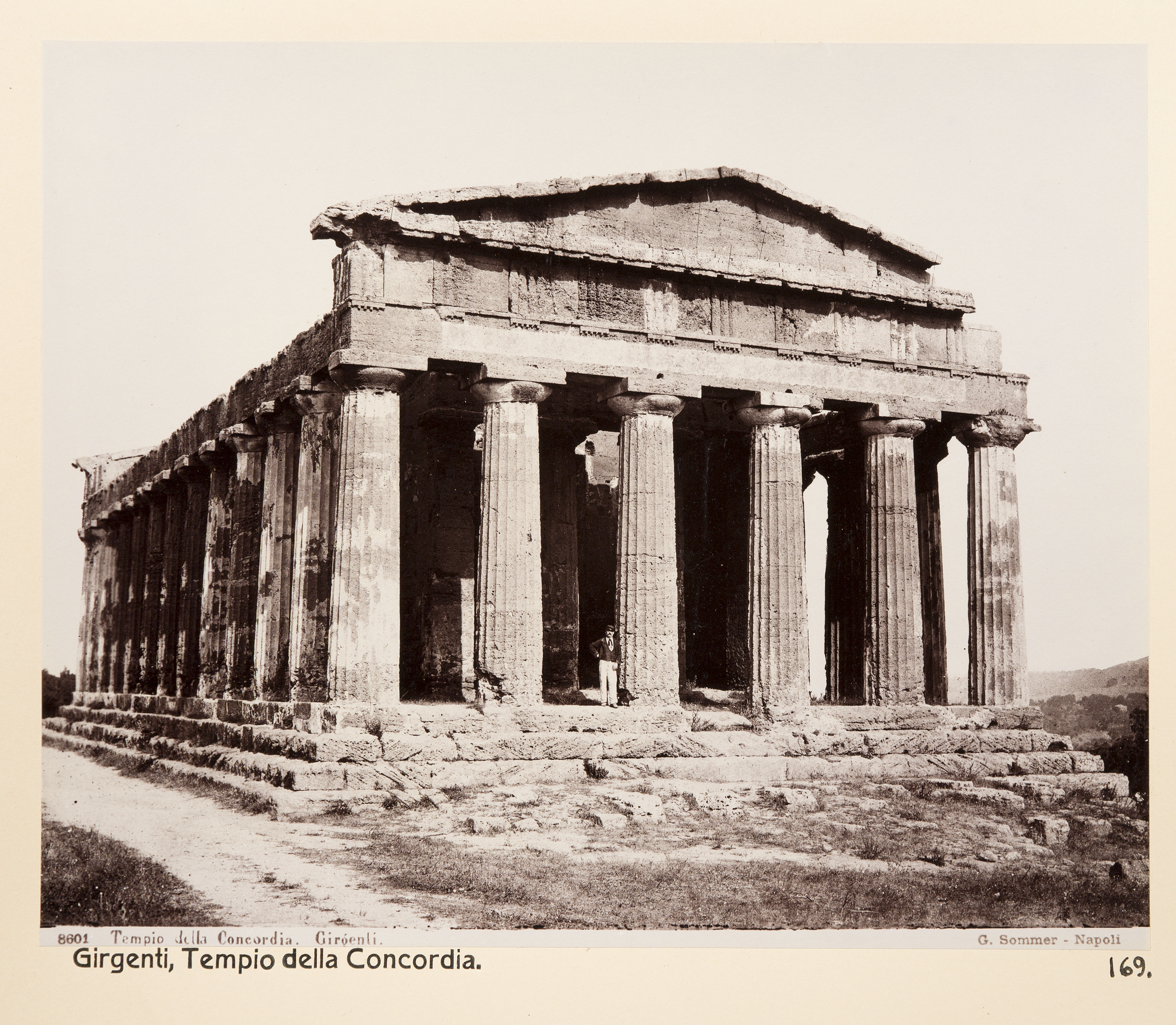
circa 1888

== See also ==
- List of Ancient Greek temples
