= Alexander Hardcastle =

Alexander Hardcastle (25 October 1872 – 27 June 1933) was a British archaeologist, who supervised archaeological work in Sicily, restoring the Greek Temples of Agrigento.

== Background ==
Alexander Hardcastle was born in London to a prosperous family. His parents were Henry and Maria Sophie Hardcastle Herschel, daughter of John Herschel. From 1892 he served in the Royal Engineers, seeing active service in the Boer War in 1900 and afterwards was Commander Royal Engineers in Natal. In 1903 he was promoted to Captain and retired in 1907. He was called back into service in 1914 on the outbreak of the First World War but saw no overseas service.

In 1920, Hardcastle vacationed on Sicily. While there, he visited the unexcavated Greek ruins on the southwest coast of the island. These ruins inspired him to move to the island and begin work on the ruins. Even though his family was well-off, the expenses of the work on the Greek sites on the island, coupled with his losses from the U.S. stock-market crash of 1929, eventually led to Hardcastle's financial ruin.

== Work at Agrigento and Akragas ==
Without academic training as an archaeologist, Hardcastle teamed with the Italian archaeologist Pirro Marconi, making restorations to temples and the city walls in addition to general work on the vast fifth-century B.C. site, now called the Valley of the Temples (Valle dei Templi). Hardcastle also worked at Akragas, a sixth-century B.C. city-state in the same area.

== End of life ==
Bankrupt from his financial losses due to the Wall Street Crash of 1929 and the expenses of his archaeological work, he sold his Italian home, Villa Aurea, and was committed to the mental asylum in Agrigento. On 27 June 1933 he died in the asylum, aged 60.

Grave Plaque of Alexander Hardcastle on the Agrigento cementary.

== Honors and legacy ==
- The Italian government bestowed on him the rank of Commander of the Order of the Crown of Italy (Ordine della Corona d'Italia) in 1928.
- The town of Agrigento made him an honorary citizen.
- At the entrance to the archaeological site at Agrigento, there is a square named after him.
- In 2008, his villa became the representative office of the Archaeological Park.
- In 2017, the British Museum held the exhibition "Assessorato Beni Culturali e Identità Siciliana Dipartimento Beni Culturali e Identità Siciliana I tesori di Akragas|Treasures of Akragas" to celebrate Hardcastle's contributions to archaeology.
- A centenary display of sculpture at the Valley of the Temples by the Italian contemporary artist Gianfranco Meggiato, an admirer of Hardcastle, continued into 2022.
- Alexander Hardcastle Foundation.
