= Pteron =

External colonnade around a building, common in Classical architecture

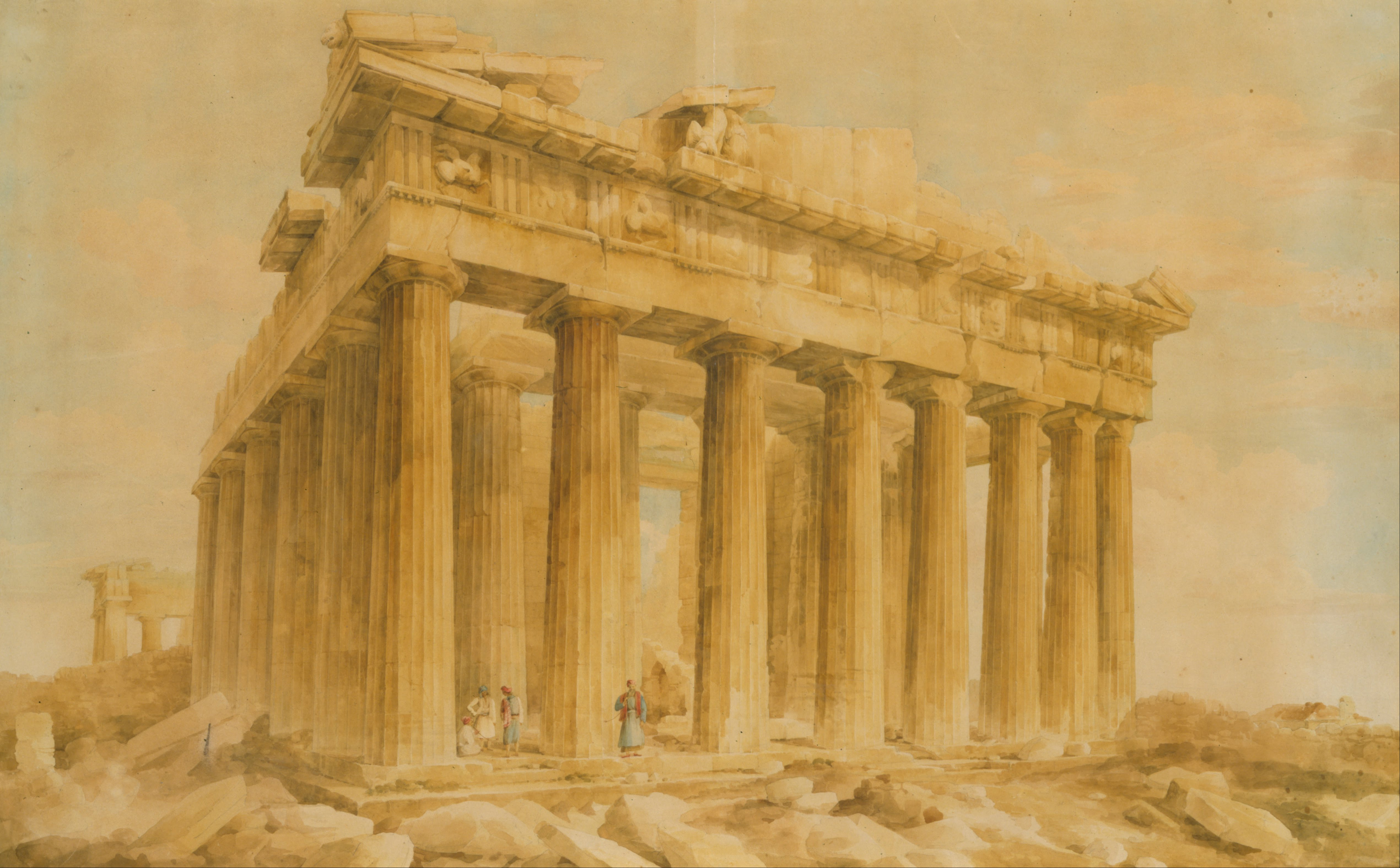
Pteron of the Parthenon

In Classical architecture, a pteron (Ancient Greek: πτερον, 'wing') is an external colonnade around a building, especially an Ancient Greek temple. The pteroma or peristasis is the passage between the columns and the wall in a temple, the peristyle that in an inward-facing courtyard or garden.
