= Peripteros =

Type of Ancient Greek or Roman temple

A peripteros surrounded by a peristasis

In Classical architecture, a peripteros (Ancient Greek: περίπτερος; see peripterous) is a type of ancient Greek or Roman temple surrounded by a portico with columns. It is surrounded by a colonnade (pteron) on all four sides of the cella (naos), creating a four-sided arcade, or peristyle (peristasis). By extension, it also means simply the perimeter of a building (typically a classical temple), when that perimeter is made up of columns. The term is frequently used of buildings in the Doric order.

== Definition ==
The peripteros can be a portico, a kiosk, or a chapel. If it is made up of four columns, it is a tetrastyle; of six, hexastyle; of eight, octastyle; of ten, decastyle; and of twelve, dodecastyle. If the columns are fitted into the wall instead of standing alone, the building is a pseudoperipteros.
