= Opisthodomos =

Space located at the rear of Greek temples

Plan of a temple with opisthodomos highlighted.

An opisthodomos (ὀπισθόδομος, 'back room') is either the rear room of an ancient Greek temple or to the inner shrine, also called the adyton ('not to be entered'). The confusion arises from the lack of agreement in ancient inscriptions. In modern scholarship, it usually refers to the rear porch of a temple. On the Athenian Acropolis especially, the opisthodomos came to be a treasury, where the revenues and precious dedications of the temple were kept. Its use in antiquity was not standardised. In part because of the ritual secrecy of such inner spaces, it is not known exactly what took place within opisthodomoi; it can safely be assumed that practice varied widely by place, date and particular temple.

Architecturally, the opisthodomos (as a back room) balances the pronaos or porch of a temple, creating a plan with diaxial symmetry. The upper portion of its outer wall could be decorated with a frieze, as on the Hephaisteion and the Parthenon.

Opisthodomoi are present in the layout of:

- Temples ER, A and O at Selinus
- Temple of Aphaea at Aegina
- Temple of Zeus at Olympia
- Hephaisteion in the Agora of Athens
- Parthenon on the Acropolis in Athens
- Temple of Concordia, Agrigento
- Temple of Poseidon on Cape Sounion
- Temple of Apollo Epikourios at Bassae
- Temple of Athena Lindia at Lindos
- Temple of Dionysus at Teos
- Temple of Apollo at Delphi
