= Peristasis (architecture) =

Hallway of columns in some styles of Greek temple

A peripteros with a peristasis between the columns (dots) and the walls

The peristasis (Ancient Greek: περίστασις) was a four-sided porch or hallway of columns surrounding the cella (naos) in an ancient Greek peripteral temple. This allowed priests to pass round the cella (along a pteron) in cultic processions.

If such a hall of columns surrounds a patio or garden, it is called a peristyle rather than a peristasis.

In ecclesial architecture, it is also used to designate the area between the baluster of a Catholic church and the high altar (what is usually called the sanctuary or chancel).
