= Crepidoma =

Feature in classical Greek architecture

In classical Greek architecture, crepidoma (Ancient Greek: κρηπίδωμα) is the foundation of one or more steps on which the superstructure of a building is erected. Usually the crepidoma has three levels, especially in Doric temples. However, exceptions are common: For example, the Heraion at Olympia features only two steps, and the Olympeion at Agrigento, Sicily has four.

Each level of crepidoma typically decreases in size incrementally going upwards, forming a series of steps along all or some sides of the building. The crepidoma rests on the euthynteria (Ancient Greek: ἡ εὐθυντηρία) or foundation, which historically was constructed of locally available stone for the sake of economy.

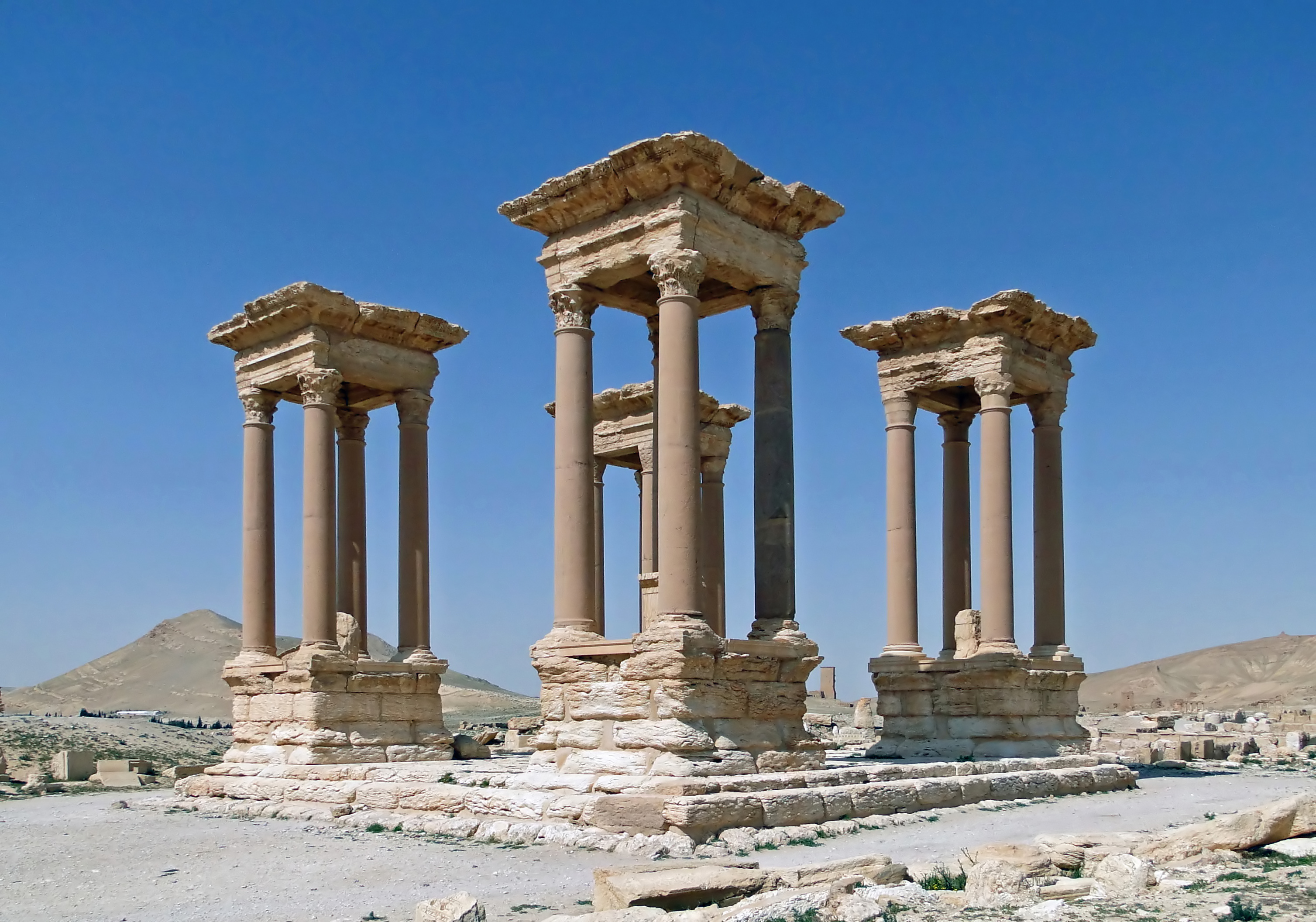
The crepidoma of the Tetrapylon at Palmyra, Syria

The topmost level of the crepidoma is called the stylobate (Ancient Greek: ὁ στῡλοβᾰ́της) and it is the platform for the columns (Ancient Greek: οἵ στῦλοι – styloi). The lower levels of the crepidoma are called the stereobates. The step-like arrangement of the crepidoma may extend around all four sides of a structure like a temple, for example, on the Parthenon in Athens, Greece. On some temples, the steps extend only across the front façade, or they may wrap around the sides for a short distance, a detail that is called a return, as seen at the Sanctuary of Despoina at Lycosoura.

It is common for the hidden portions of each level of the stereobate to be of a lower grade of material than the exposed elements of the steps and the stylobate; each higher level of the crepidoma typically covers the clamps used to hold the stones of the lower level together. The lower margins of each level of the crepidoma blocks are often cut back in a series of two or three steps to create shadow lines; this decorative technique is termed a reveal.
