= Ancient Greek temple =

Buildings housing cult statues in Greek sanctuaries

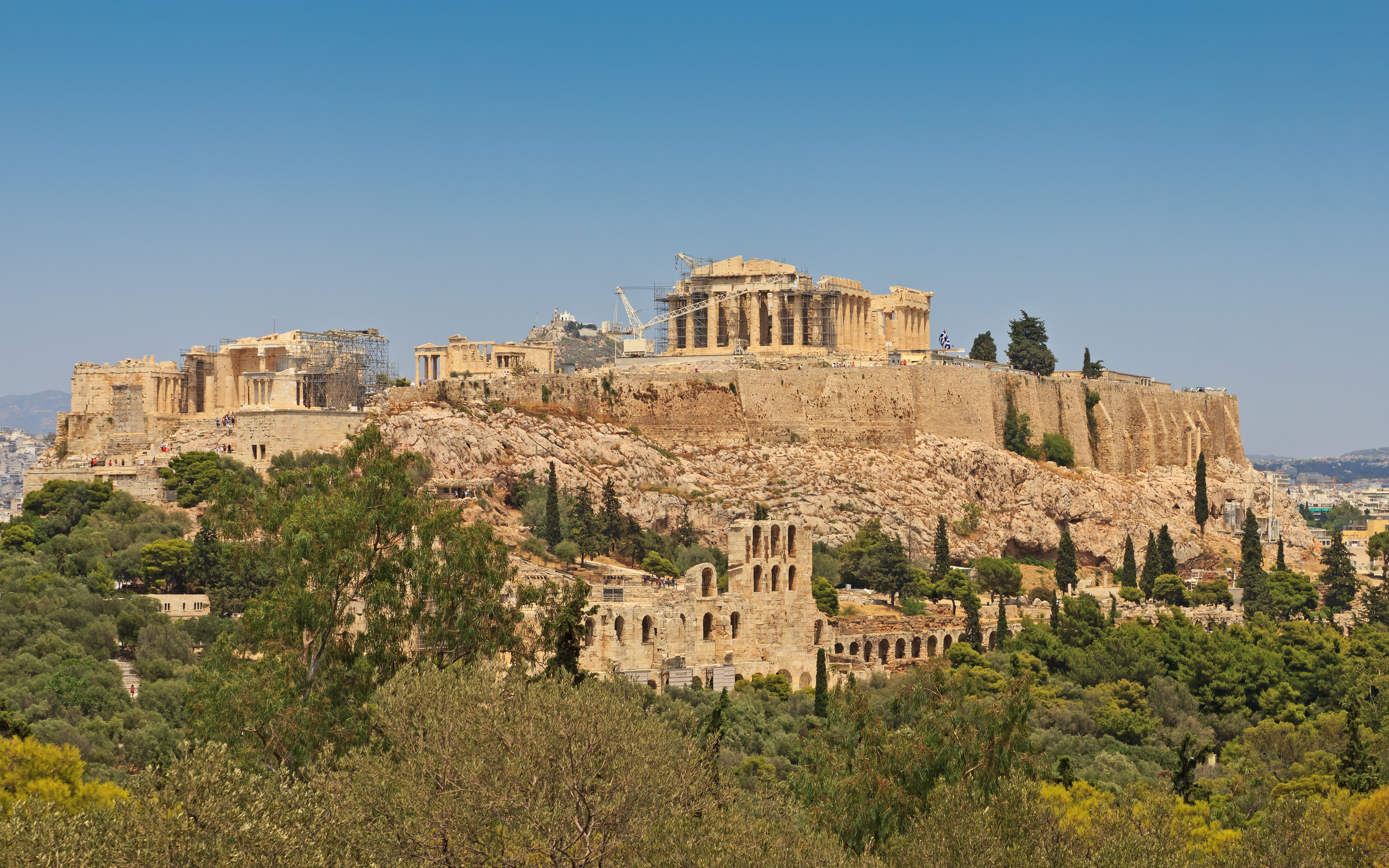
The Parthenon, on the Acropolis of Athens, Greece

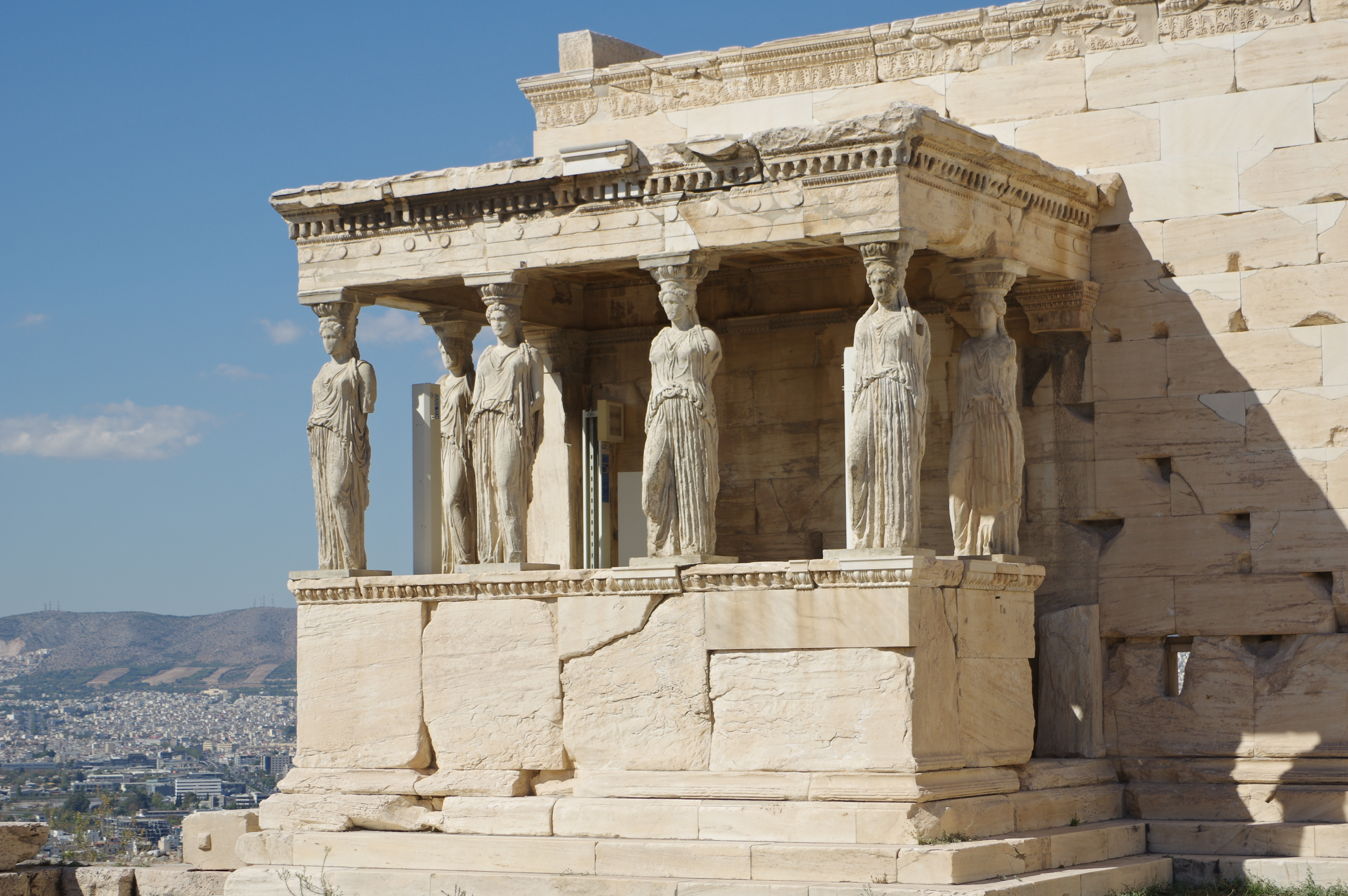
The Caryatid porch of the Erechtheion in Athens

Greek temples (Ancient Greek: ναός, romanized: nāós, lit. 'dwelling', semantically distinct from Latin templum, "temple") were structures built to house deity statues within Greek sanctuaries in ancient Greek religion. The temple interiors did not serve as meeting places, since the sacrifices and rituals dedicated to the deity took place outside them, within the wider precinct of the sanctuary, which might be large. Temples were frequently used to store votive offerings. They are the most important and most widespread surviving building type in Greek architecture. In the Hellenistic kingdoms of Southwest Asia and of North Africa, buildings erected to fulfill the functions of a temple often continued to follow the local traditions. Even where a Greek influence is visible, such structures are not normally considered as Greek temples. This applies, for example, to the Graeco-Parthian and Bactrian temples, or to the Ptolemaic examples, which follow Egyptian tradition. Most Greek temples were oriented astronomically.

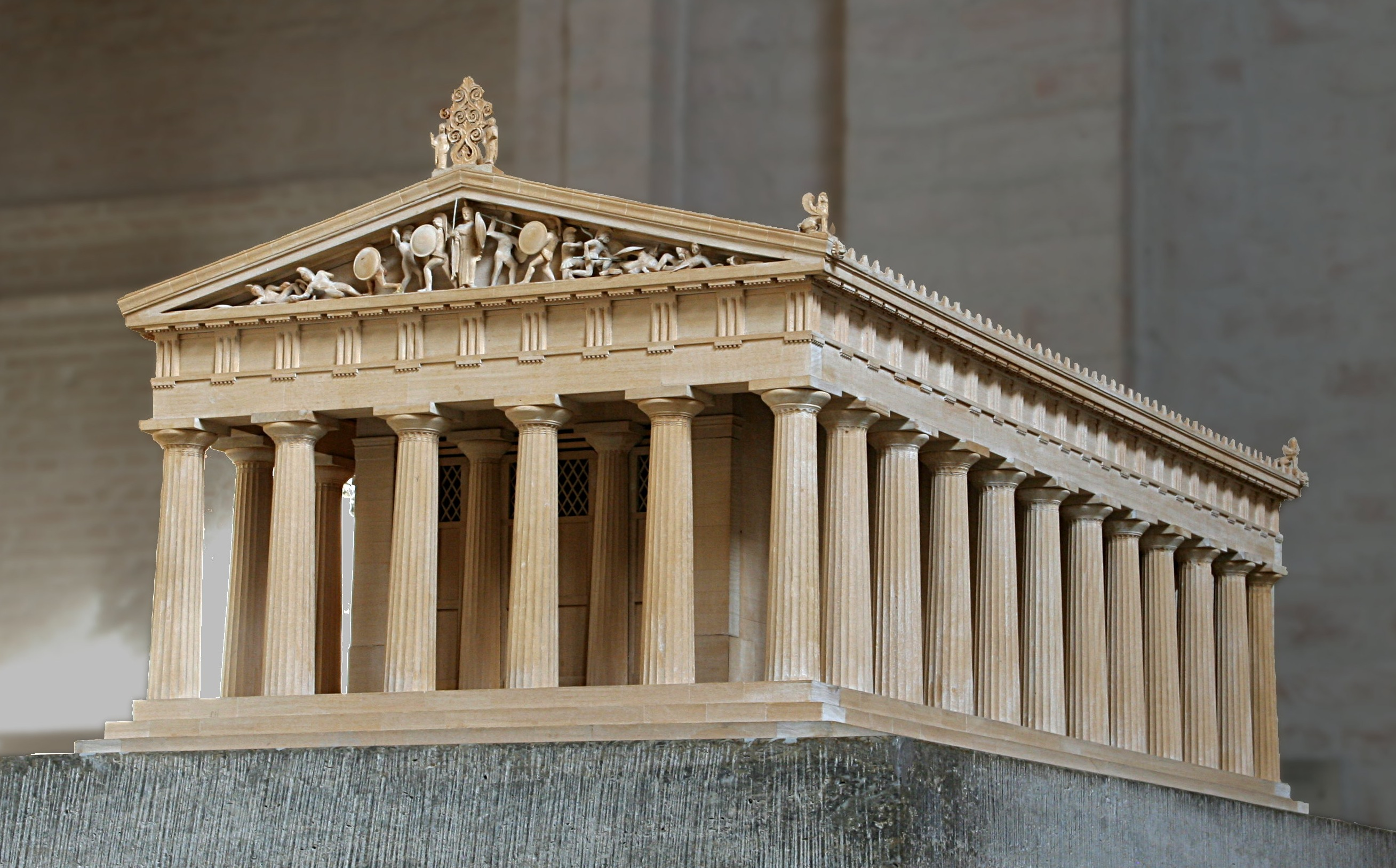
Model of a typical Doric temple, the Temple of Aphaia on Aegina (Glyptothek, Munich)

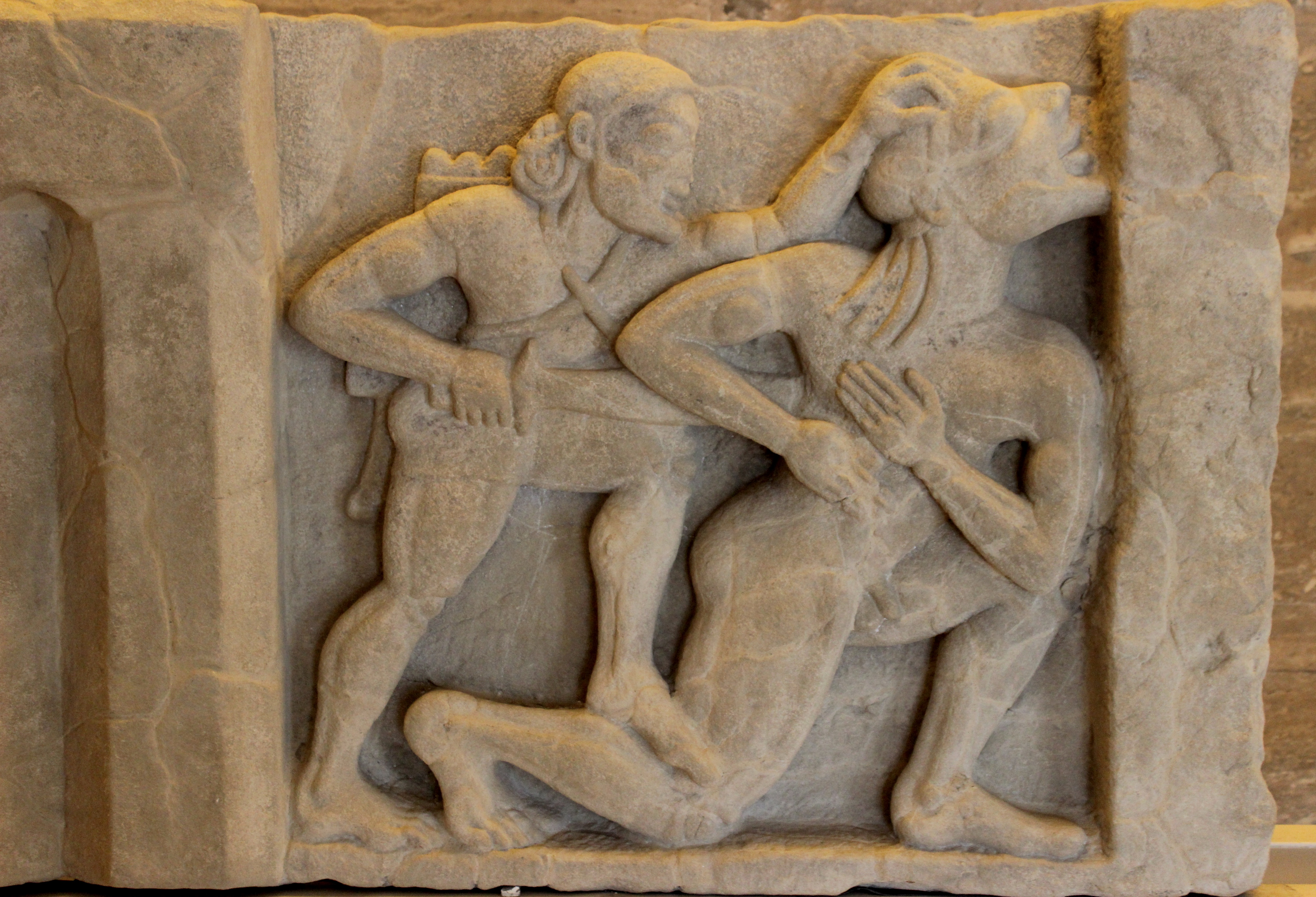
Early metope fill lichude, museum at Paestum, depicting Heracles killing a giant

Between the 9th century BC and the 6th century BC, the ancient Greek temples developed from the small mud brick structures into double-porched monumental "peripteral" buildings with colonnade on all sides, often reaching more than 20 metres in height (not including the roof). Stylistically, they were governed by the regionally specific architectural orders. Whereas the distinction was originally between the Doric and Ionic orders, a third alternative arose in late 3rd century with the Corinthian order. A multitude of different ground plans were developed, each of which could be combined with the superstructure in the different orders. Temples would be destroyed due to warfare in the Greek World or from lack of repairs. Some of these temples such as the temple of Poseidon Soter (The Savior) would be rebuilt outside of Athens after the defeat of the Persian Empire in 449. From the 3rd century onward, the construction of large temples became less common; after a short 2nd century BC flourish, it ceased nearly entirely in the 1st century BC. Thereafter, only smaller structures were started, while older temples continued to be renovated or brought to completion if in an unfinished state.

Greek temples were designed and constructed according to set proportions, mostly determined by the lower diameter of the columns or by the dimensions of the foundation levels. The nearly mathematical strictness of the basic designs thus reached was lightened by optical refinements. In spite of the still widespread idealised image, Greek temples were painted, so that bright reds and blues contrasted with the white of the building stones or of stucco. The more elaborate temples were equipped with very rich figural decoration in the form of reliefs and sculptures on the pediment. The construction of temples was usually organised and financed by cities or by the administrations of sanctuaries. Private individuals, especially Hellenistic rulers, could also sponsor such buildings. In the late Hellenistic period, their decreasing financial wealth, along with the progressive incorporation of the Greek world within the Roman state, whose officials and rulers took over as sponsors, led to the end of Greek temple construction. New temples now belonged to the tradition of the Roman temple, which, in spite of the very strong Greek influence on it, aimed for different goals and followed different aesthetic principles (for a comparison, see the other article).

The main temple building sat within a larger precinct or temenos, usually surrounded by a peribolos fence or wall; the whole is usually called a "sanctuary". The Acropolis of Athens is the most famous example, though this was apparently walled as a citadel before a temple was ever built there. This might include many subsidiary buildings, sacred groves or springs, animals dedicated to the deity, and sometimes people who had taken sanctuary from the law, which some temples offered, for example to runaway slaves.

== Development ==
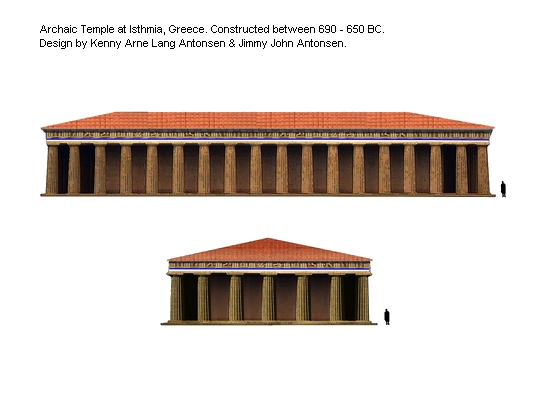
Temple of Isthmia, Greece. Constructed between 690 and 650 BC

=== Origins ===
The earliest Greek Sanctuaries probably did not contain temple buildings, though our knowledge of these is limited since many of these were destroyed, and the subject is controversial. A typical early sanctuary seems to have consisted of a temenos, often around a sacred grove, cave or spring, and perhaps defined only by marker stones at intervals, with an altar for offerings. Many rural sanctuaries probably stayed in this style, but the more popular were gradually able to afford a building to house a cult image, especially in cities. This process was certainly under way by the 9th century BC, and probably started earlier.

The Mycenaean megaron (15th to the 13th century BC) was the precursor for later Archaic and Classical Greek temples, but during the Greek Dark Age the buildings became smaller and less monumental. The basic principles for the development of Greek temple architecture have their roots between the 10th century BC and the 7th century BC. In its simplest form as a naos, the temple was a simple rectangular shrine with protruding side walls (antae), forming a small porch. Until the 8th century BC, there were also apsidal structures with more or less semi-circular back walls, but the rectangular type prevailed. By adding columns to this small basic structure, the Greeks triggered the development and variety of their temple architecture.

The Temple of Isthmia, built in 690–650 BC was perhaps the first true Archaic temple. Its size, colonnade, and roof made it different from then-contemporary buildings.

=== Wooden architecture: Early Archaic ===
The first temples were mostly mud, brick, and marble structures on stone foundations. The columns and superstructure (entablature) were wooden, door openings and antae were protected with wooden planks. The mud brick walls were often reinforced by wooden posts, in a type of half-timbered technique. The elements of this simple and clearly structured wooden architecture produced all the important design principles that were to determine the development of Greek temples for centuries.

Near the end of the 7th century, the dimensions of these simple structures were increased considerably. Temple C at Thermos is the first of the hekatompedoi, temples with a length of 100 feet (30 m). Since it was not technically possible to roof broad spaces at that time, these temples remained very narrow, at 6 to 10 metres in width.

To stress the importance of the cult statue and the building holding it, the naos was equipped with a canopy, supported by columns. The resulting set of colonnade surrounding the temple on all sides (the peristasis) was exclusively used for temples in Greek architecture.

The combination of the temple with colonnades (ptera) on all sides posed a new aesthetic challenge for the architects and patrons: the structures had to be built to be viewed from all directions. This led to the development of the peripteros, with a frontal pronaos (porch), mirrored by a similar arrangement at the back of the building, the opisthodomos, which became necessary for entirely aesthetic reasons.

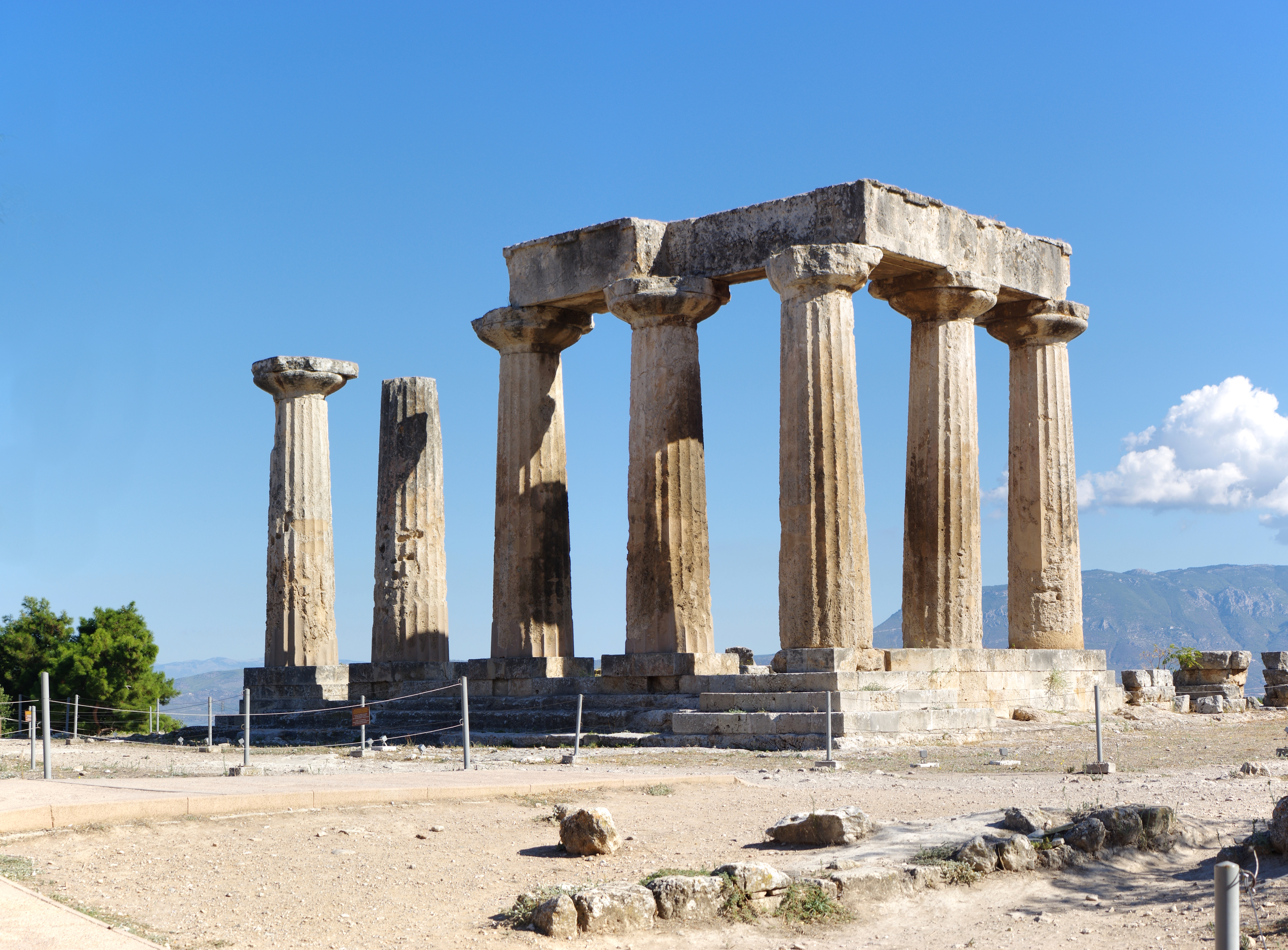
The Temple of Apollo at Corinth, one of the earliest stone-built Doric temples. Note the monolithic columns

=== Introduction of stone architecture: Archaic and Classical ===
After the reintroduction of stone architecture, the essential elements and forms of each temple, such as the number of columns and of column rows, underwent constant change throughout Greek antiquity.

In the 6th century BC, Ionian Samos developed the double-colonnaded dipteros as an alternative to the single peripteros. This idea was later copied in Didyma, Ephesos and Athens. Between the 6th and the late 4th century, innumerable temples were built; nearly every polis, every Greek colony contained one or several. There were also temples at extra-urban sites and at major sanctuaries like Olympia and Delphi.

The observable change of form indicates the search for a harmonious form of all architectural elements: the development led from simpler early forms which often appear coarse and bulky up to the aesthetic perfection and refinement of the later structures; from simple experimentation to the strict mathematical complexity of ground plans and superstructures.

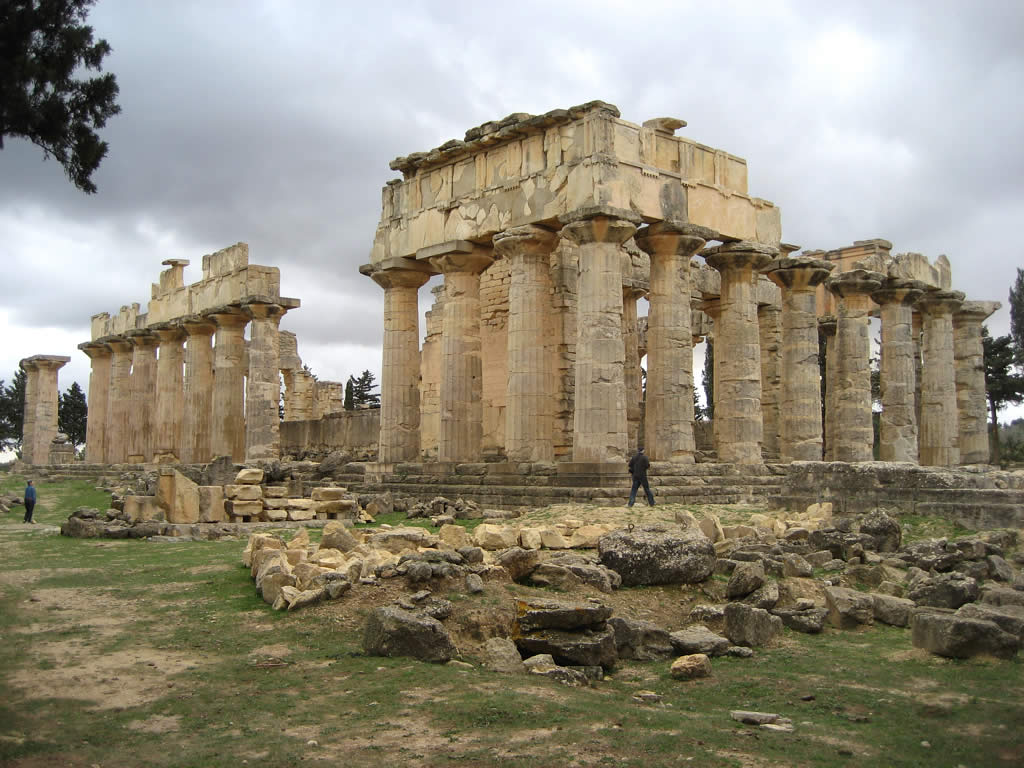
The temple of Zeus in Cyrene, Libya

=== Decline of Greek temple building: Hellenistic period ===
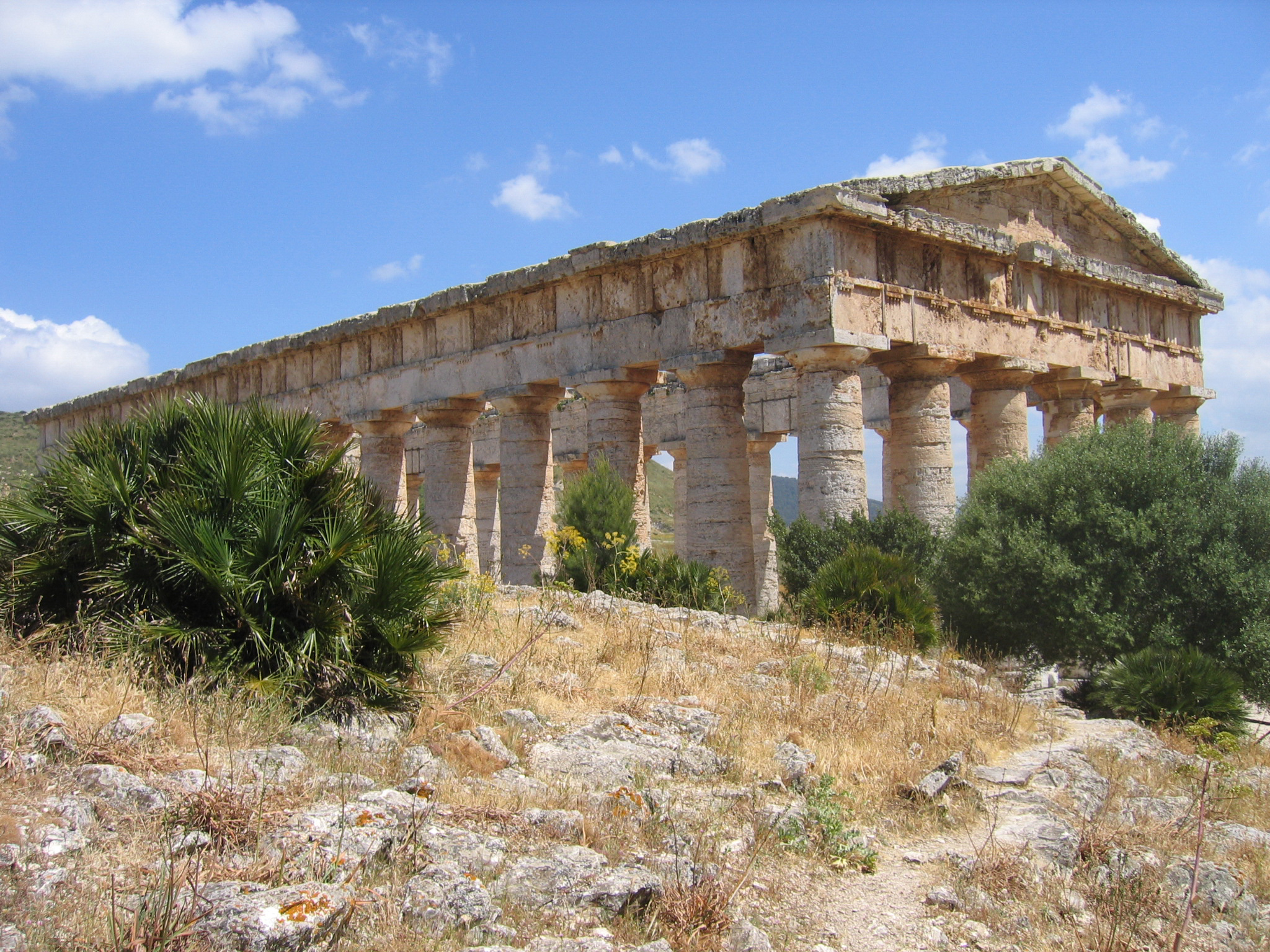
Temple of Hera in Segesta, Sicily

From the early Hellenistic period onwards, the Greek peripteral temple lost much of its importance. With very few exceptions, Classical temple construction ceased both in Hellenistic Greece and in the Greek colonies of Magna Graecia. Only the west of Asia Minor maintained a low level of temple construction during the 3rd century. The construction of large projects, such as the temple of Apollo at Didyma near Miletus and the Artemision at Sardis did not make much progress.

The 2nd century saw a revival of temple architecture, including peripteral temples. This is partially due to the influence of the architect Hermogenes of Priene, who redefined the principles of Ionic temple construction both practically and through theoretical work. At the same time, the rulers of the various Hellenistic kingdoms provided copious financial resources. Their self-aggrandisation, rivalry, desires to stabilise their spheres of influence, as well as the increasing conflict with Rome (partially played out in the field of culture), combined to release much energy into the revival of complex Greek temple architecture. During this phase, Greek temples became widespread in southern Asia Minor, Egypt and Northern Africa.

But in spite of such examples and of the positive conditions produced by the economic upturn and the high degree of technical innovation in the 3rd and 2nd centuries, Hellenistic religious architecture is mostly represented by a multitude of small temples in antis and prostyle temples, as well as tiny shrines (naiskoi). The latter had been erected in important places, on market squares, near springs and by roads, since the Archaic period, but reached their main flourish now. This limitation to smaller structures led to the development of a special form, the pseudoperipteros, which uses engaged columns along the naos walls to produce the illusion of a peripteral temple. An early case of this is temple L at Epidauros, followed by many prominent Roman examples, such as the Maison Carrée at Nîmes.

=== End of Greek temple construction: Roman Greece ===
In the early 1st century BC, the Mithridatic Wars led to changes of architectural practice. The role of sponsor was increasingly taken by Roman magistrates of the Eastern provinces, who rarely demonstrated their generosity by building temples. Nevertheless, some temples were erected at this time, e.g. the Temple of Aphrodite at Aphrodisias.

The introduction of the principate lead to few new buildings, mostly temples for the imperial cult or to Roman deities, e.g. the Temple of Jupiter at Baalbek. Although new temples to Greek deities still continued to be constructed, e.g. the Tychaion at Selge they tend to follow the canonical forms of the developing Roman imperial style of architecture or to maintain local non-Greek idiosyncrasies, like the temples in Petra or Palmyra. The increasing romanisation of the east entailed the end of Greek temple architecture, although work continued on the completion of unfinished large structures like the temple of Apollo at Didyma or the Olympieion at Athens into the later 2nd century AD.

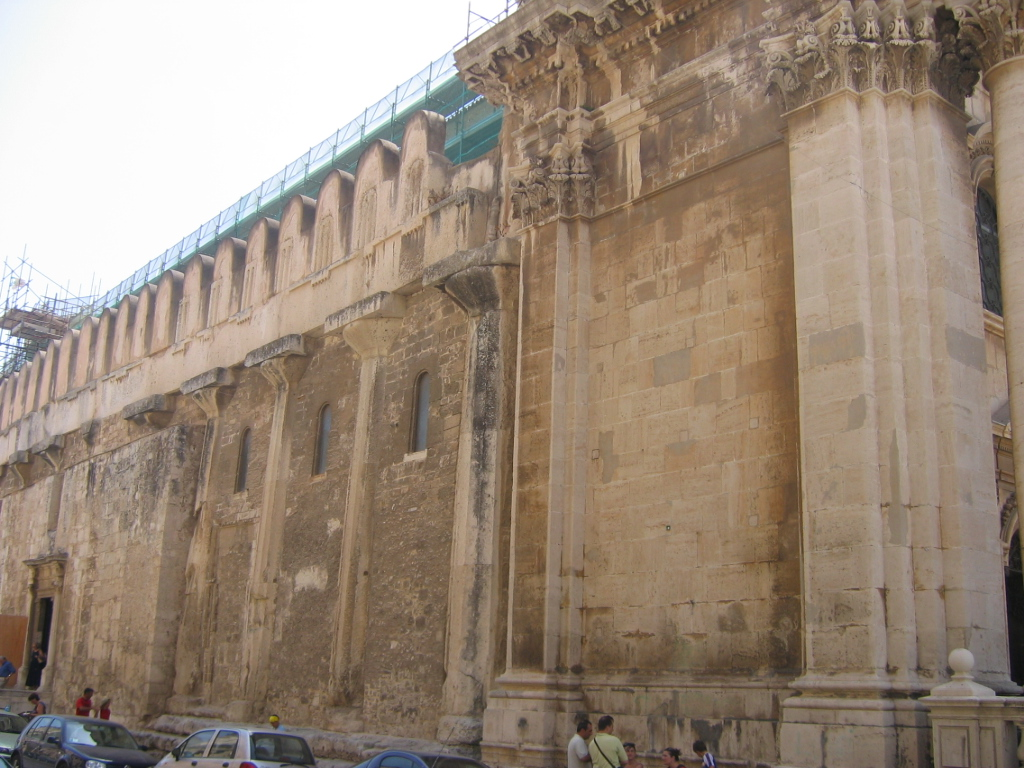
The 5th century BC Doric temple of Athena, Syracuse, Sicily, transformed into a Christian church during the Middle Ages.

=== Abandonment and conversion of temples: Late Antiquity ===
The edicts of Theodosius I and his successors on the throne of the Roman Empire, banning pagan cults, led to the gradual closure of Greek temples, or their conversion into Christian churches.

Thus ends the history of the Greek temples' original purpose, although many of them remained in use for a long time afterwards. For example, the Athenian Parthenon, first reconsecrated as a church was turned into a mosque after the Ottoman conquest and remained structurally unharmed until the 17th century AD. Only the unfortunate impact of a Venetian cannonball into the building, then used to store gunpowder, led to the destruction of much of this important temple, more than 2,000 years after it was built.

== Structure ==
Canonical Greek temples maintained the same basic structure throughout many centuries. The Greeks used a limited number of spatial components, influencing the plan, and of architectural members, determining the elevation.

=== Floor plan ===
==== Naos ====
The central cult structure of the temple is the naos or cella, which usually contained a cult statue of the deity. In Archaic temples, a separate room, the so-called adyton was sometimes included after the naos for this purpose. In Sicily, this habit continued into the Classical period.

==== Pronaos and opisthodomos ====
In front of the naos, there is a porch, the pronaos, created by the protruding side walls of the naos (the antae), and two columns placed between them. A door allows the naos to be accessed from the pronaos. A similar room at the back of the naos is called the opisthodomos. There is no door connecting the opisthodomos with the naos; its existence is necessitated entirely by aesthetic considerations: to maintain the consistency of the peripteral temple and to ensure its visibility from all sides, the execution of the front has to be repeated at the rear. A restricted space, the adyton, may be included at the far end of the naos, backing up on the opisthodomos.

==== Peristasis ====
The complex formed by the naos, pronaos, opisthodomos and possibly the adyton is enclosed on all four sides by the peristasis, usually a single row, rarely a double one, of columns. This produces a surrounding colonnade, the pteron, which offered shelter to visitors of the sanctuary and room for cult processions.

Elements of the floor plan

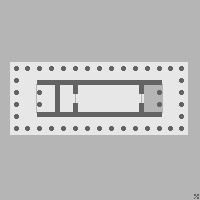
Pronaos

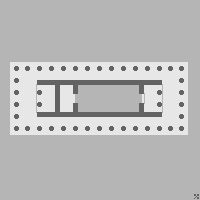
Naos or Cella

Adyton (exceptional)

Opisthodomos (sometimes omitted)

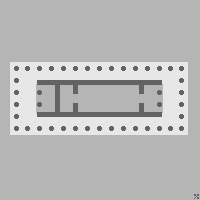
Opisthodomos + Adyton + Naos + Pronaos

==== Plan types ====
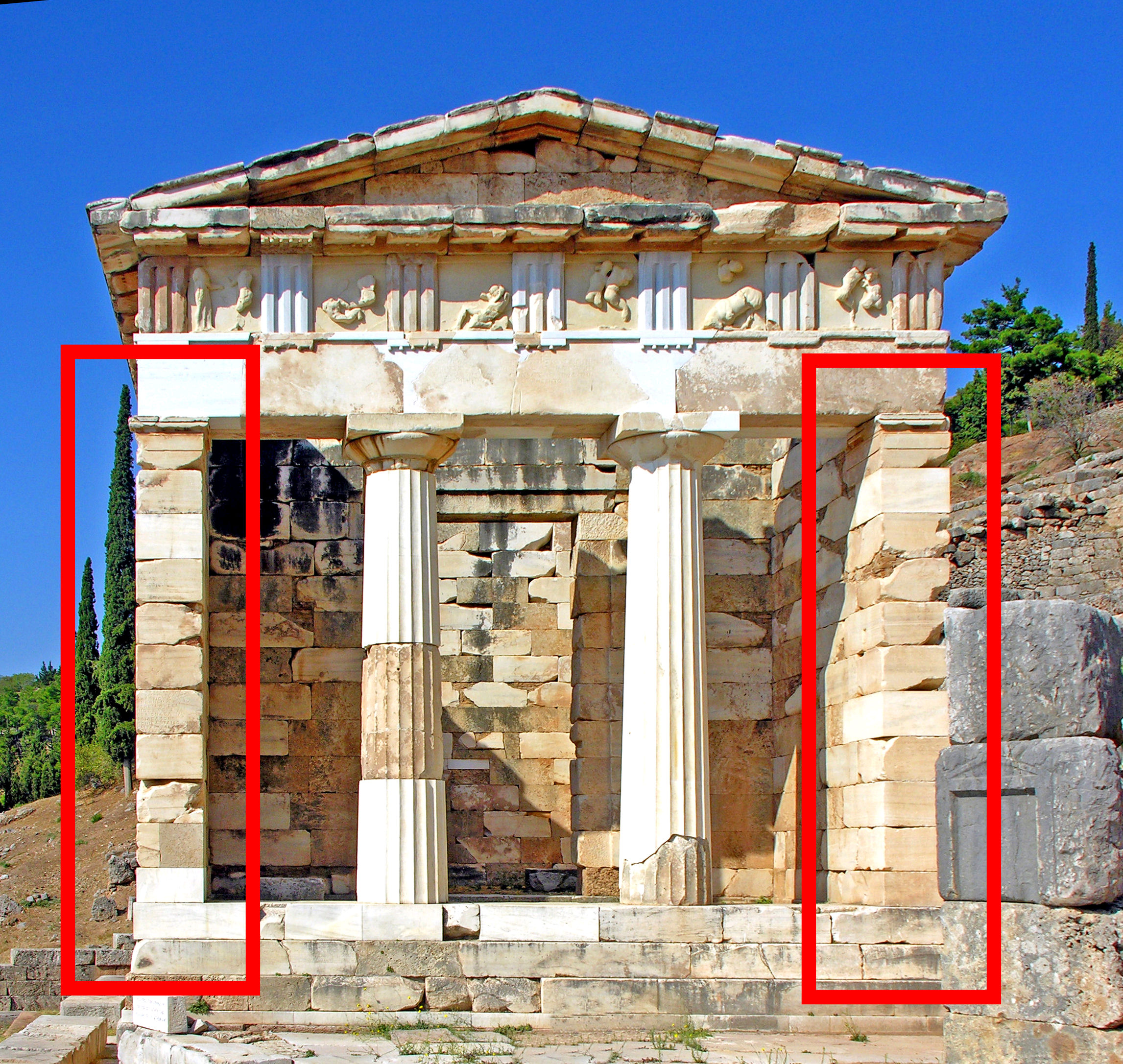
The Athenian Treasury in Delphi: distyle in antis as two antae frame two columns

These components allowed the realisation of a variety of different plan types in Greek temple architecture. The simplest example of a Greek temple is the templum in antis, a small rectangular structure sheltering the cult statue. In front of the naos, a small porch or pronaos was formed by the protruding naos walls, the antae. The pronaos was linked to the naos by a door. To support the superstructure, two columns were placed between the antae (distyle in antis). When equipped with an opisthodomos with a similar distyle in antis design, this is called a double anta temple. A variant of that type has the opisthodomos at the back of the naos indicated merely by half-columns and shortened antae, so that it can be described as a pseudo-opisthodomos.

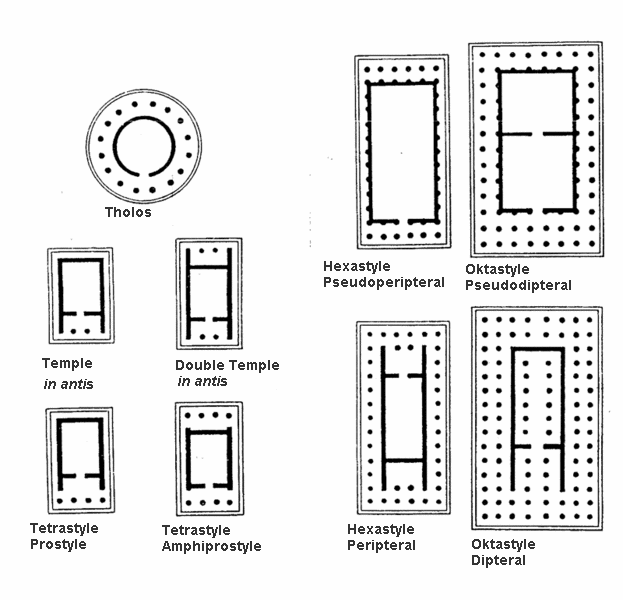
Different temple plans

If the porch of a temple in antis has a row of usually four or six columns in front of its whole breadth, the temple is described as a prostylos or prostyle temples. The whole pronaos may be omitted in this case or just leave the antae without columns. An amphiprostylos or amphiprostyle repeats the same column setting at the back.

In contrast, the term peripteros or peripteral designates a temple surrounded by ptera (colonnades) on all four sides, each usually formed by a single row of columns. This produces an unobstructed surrounding portico, the peristasis, on all four sides of the temple. A Hellenistic and Roman form of this shape is the pseudoperipteros, where the side columns of the peristasis are indicated only by engaged columns or pilasters directly attached to the external naos walls.

A dipteros or dipteral is equipped with a double colonnade on all four sides, sometimes with further rows of columns at the front and back. A pseudodipteros has engaged columns in the inner row of columns at the sides.

Circular temples form a special type. If they are surrounded by a colonnade, they are known as peripteral tholoi. Although of sacred character, their function as a temple can often not be asserted. A comparable structure is the monopteros, or cyclostyle which, however, lacks a naos.

To clarify ground plan types, the defining terms can be combined, producing terms such as: peripteral double anta temple, prostyle in antis, peripteral amphiprostyle, etc.

==== Column number terminology ====
An additional definition, already used by Vitruvius (IV, 3, 3) is determined by the number of columns at the front. Modern scholarship uses the following terms:

technical term	number of columns at front
distyle	2 columns
tetrastyle	4 columns, term used by Vitruvius
hexastyle	6 columns, term used by Vitruvius
octastyle	8 columns
decastyle	10 columns

The term dodekastylos is only used for the 12-column hall at the Didymaion. No temples with facades of that width are known.

Very few temples had an uneven number of columns at the front. Examples are Temple of Hera I at Paestum, Temple of Apollo A at Metapontum, both of which have a width of nine columns (enneastyle), and the Archaic temple at Thermos with a width of five columns (pentastyle).

=== Elevation ===
Annotated sectional view of the Parthenon

The elevation of Greek temples is always subdivided in three zones: the crepidoma, the columns and the entablature.

==== Foundations and crepidoma ====
Stereobate, euthynteria and crepidoma form the substructure of the temple. The underground foundation of a Greek temple is known as the stereobate. It consists of several layers of squared stone blocks. The uppermost layer, the euthynteria, partially protrudes above the ground level. Its surface is carefully smoothed and levelled. It supports a further foundation of three steps, the crepidoma. The uppermost level of the crepidoma provides the surface on which the columns and walls are placed; it is called stylobate.

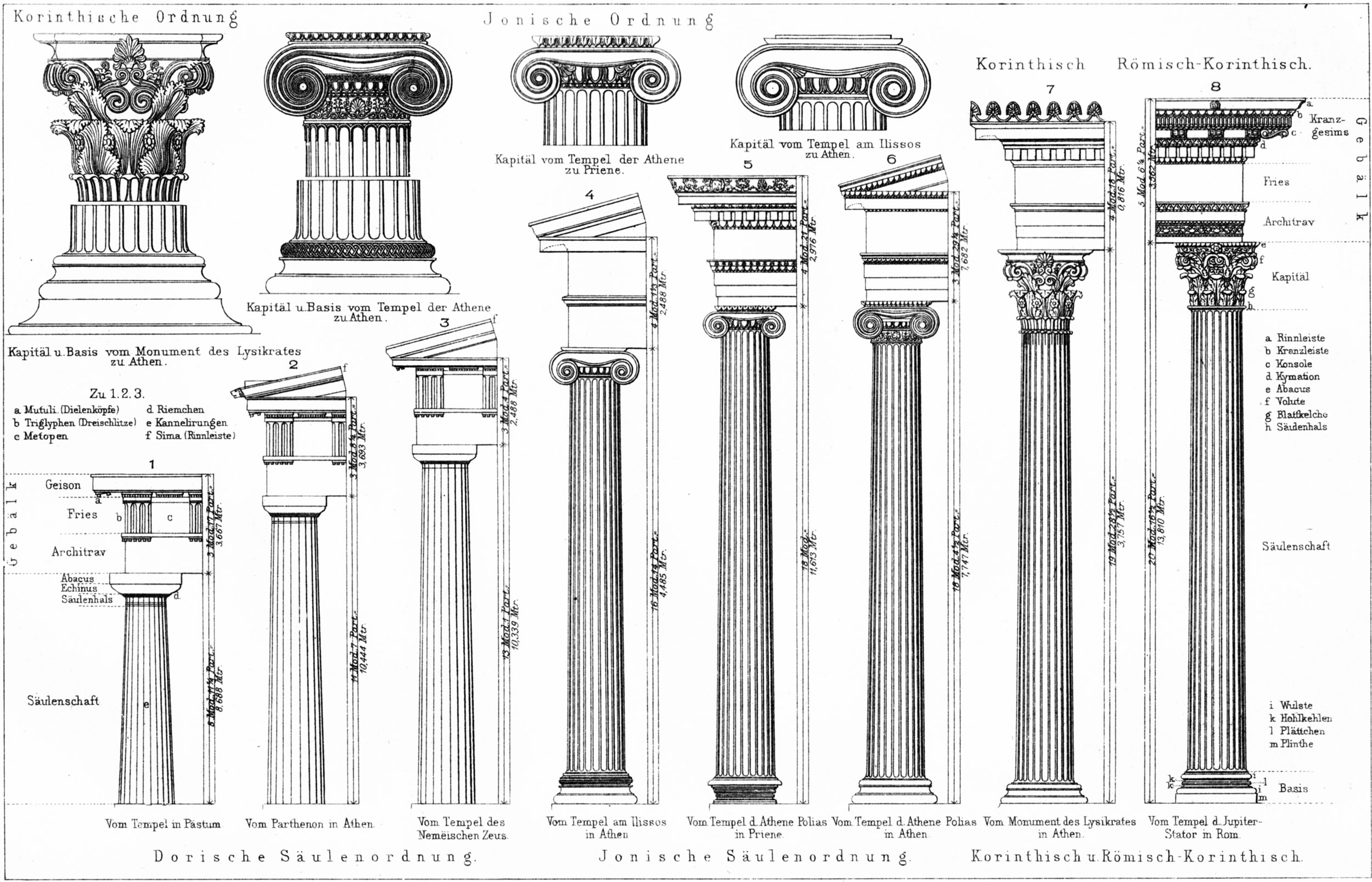
Illustration of Doric (first three), Ionic (next three) and Corinthian (final two) columns

==== Columns ====
Placed on the stylobate are the vertical column shafts, tapering towards the top. They are normally made of several separately cut column drums. Depending on the architectural order, a different number of flutings are cut into the column shaft: Doric columns have 18 to 20 flutings, Ionic and Corinthian ones normally have 24. Early Ionic columns had up to 48 flutings. While Doric columns stand directly on the stylobate, Ionic and Corinthian ones possess a base, sometimes additionally placed atop a plinth.

In Doric columns, the top is formed by a concavely curved neck, the hypotrachelion, and the capital, in Ionic columns, the capital sits directly on the shaft. In the Doric order, the capital consists of a circular torus bulge, originally very flat, the so-called echinus, and a square slab, the abacus. In the course of their development, the echinus expands more and more, culminating in a linear diagonal, at 45° to the vertical. The echinus of Ionic columns is decorated with an egg-and-dart band followed by a sculpted pillow forming two volutes, supporting a thin abacus. The eponymous Corinthian capital of the Corinthian order is crowned by rings of stylised acanthus leaves, forming tendrils and volutes that reach to the corners of the abacus.

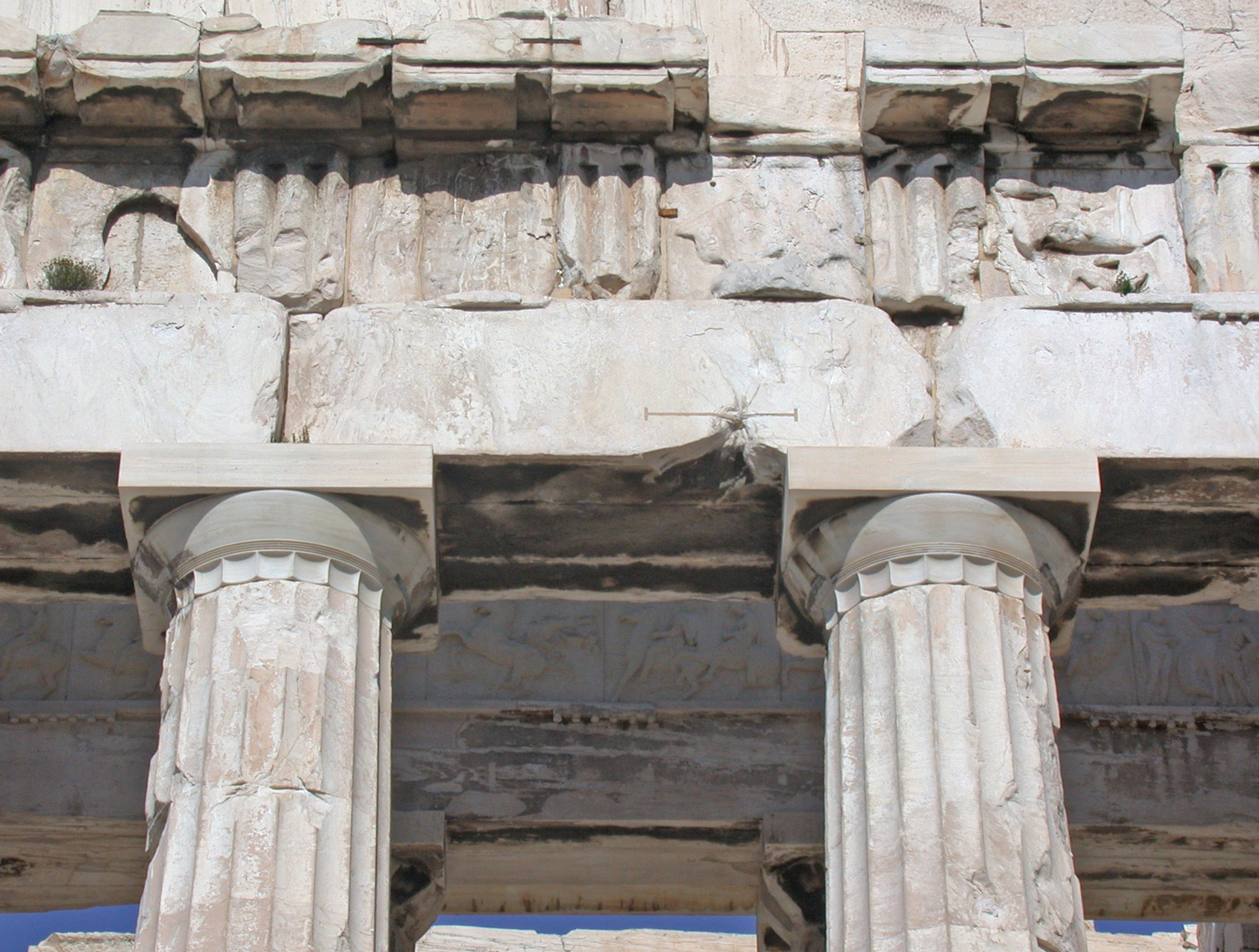
Entablature on the west side of the Parthenon

==== Entablature ====
The capitals support the entablature. In the Doric order, the entablature always consists of two parts, the architrave and the Doric frieze (or triglyph frieze). The Ionic order of Athens and the Cyclades also used a frieze above an architrave, whereas the frieze remained unknown in the Ionic architecture of Asia Minor until the 4th century BC. There, the architrave was directly followed by the dentils. The frieze was originally placed in front of the roof beams, which were externally visible only in the earlier temples of Asia Minor. The Doric frieze was structured by triglyphs. These were placed above the axis of each column, and above the centre of each intercolumniation. The spaces between the triglyphs contained metopes, sometimes painted or decorated with relief sculpture. In the Ionic or Corinthian orders, the frieze possesses no triglyphs and is simply left flat, sometimes decorated with paintings or reliefs. With the introduction of stone architecture, the protection of the porticos and the support of the roof construction was moved upwards to the level of the geison, depriving the frieze of its structural function and turning it into an entirely decorative feature. Frequently, the naos is also decorated with architrave and frieze, especially at the front of the pronaos.

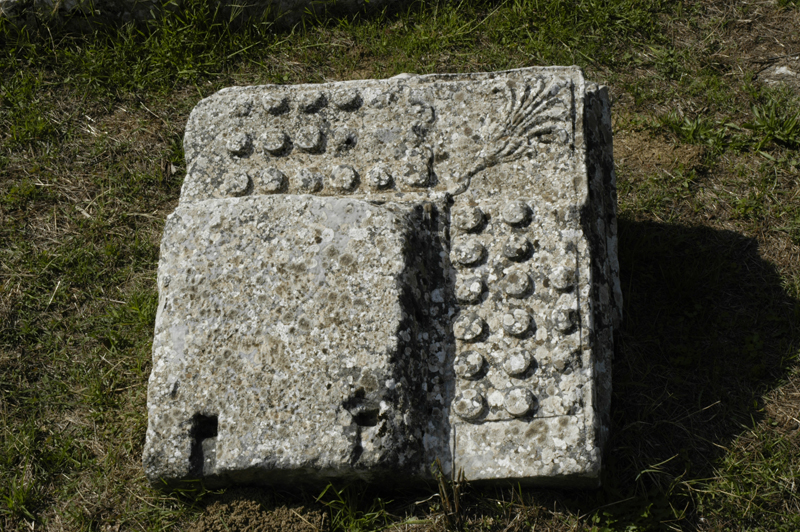
Geison block from the temple at Lykosoura.

==== Cornice and geison ====
Above the frieze, or an intermediate member, e.g. the dentil of the Ionic or Corinthian orders, the cornice protrudes notably. It consists of the geison (on the sloped sides or pediments of the narrow walls a sloped geison), and the sima. On the long side, the sima, often elaborately decorated, was equipped with water spouts, often in the shape of lions' heads. The pedimental triangle or tympanon on the narrow sides of the temple was created by the Doric introduction of the gabled roof, earlier temples often had hipped roofs. The tympanon was usually richly decorated with pedimental sculpture of mythical scenes or battles. The corners and ridges of the roof were decorated with acroteria, originally geometric, later floral or figural decorations.

=== Aspect ===
As far as topographically possible, the temples were freestanding and designed to be viewed from all sides. They were not normally designed with consideration for their surroundings, but formed autonomous structures. This is a major difference from Roman temples which were often designed as part of a planned urban area or square and had a strong emphasis on being viewed frontally.

== Design and measurements ==
=== Proportions ===
The foundations of Greek temples could reach dimensions of up to 115 by 55 m, i.e. the size of an average football pitch. Columns could reach a height of 20 m. To design such large architectural bodies harmoniously, a number of basic aesthetic principles were developed and tested already on the smaller temples. The main measurement was the foot, varying between 29 and 34 cm from region to region. This initial measurement was the basis for all the units that determined the shape of the temple. Important factors include the lower diameter of the columns and the width of their plinths. The distance between the column axes (intercolumniation or bay) could also be used as a basic unit. These measurements were in set proportions to other elements of design, such as column height and column distance. In conjunction with the number of columns per side, they also determined the dimensions of stylobate and peristasis, as well as of the naos proper. The rules regarding vertical proportions, especially in the Doric order, also allow for a deduction of the basic design options for the entablature from the same principles. Alternatives to this very rational system were sought in the temples of the late 7th and early 6th centuries, when it was attempted to develop the basic measurements from the planned dimensions of naos or stylobate, i.e. to reverse the system described above and deduce the smaller units from the bigger ones. Thus, for example, the naos length was sometimes set at 100 feet (30 m) (100 is a sacred number, also known from the hecatomb, a sacrifice of 100 animals), and all further measurements had to be in relation to this number, leading to aesthetically quite unsatisfactory solutions.

=== Naos-peristasis relationship ===
Another determining design feature was the relationship linking naos and peristasis. In the original temples, this would have been subject entirely to practical necessities, and always based on axial links between naos walls and columns, but the introduction of stone architecture broke that connection. Nevertheless, it did survive throughout Ionic architecture. In Doric temples, however, the wooden roof construction, originally placed behind the frieze, now started at a higher level, behind the geison. This ended the structural link between frieze and roof; the structural elements of the latter could now be placed independent of axial relationships. As a result, the naos walls lost their fixed connection with the columns for a long time and could be freely placed within the peristasis. Only after a long phase of developments did the architects choose the alignment of the outer wall face with the adjacent column axis as the obligatory principle for Doric temples. Doric temples in Greater Greece rarely follow this system.

=== Column number formula ===
The basic proportions of the building were determined by the numeric relationship of columns on the front and back to those on the sides. The classic solution chosen by Greek architects is the formula "frontal columns : side columns = n : (2n+1)", which can also be used for the number of intercolumniations. As a result, numerous temples of the Classical period in Greece (c. 500 to 336) had 6 × 13 columns or 5 × 11 intercolumniations. The same proportions, in a more abstract form, determine most of the Parthenon, not only in its 8 × 17 column peristasis, but also, reduced to 4:9, in all other basic measurements, including the intercolumniations, the stylobate, the width-height proportion of the entire building, and the geison (here reversed to 9:4).

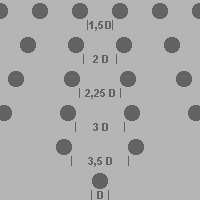
Proportion of column diameter to intercolumnium.

=== Column spacing ===
Since the turn of the 3rd and 2nd centuries BC, the proportion of column width to the space between columns, the intercolumnium, played an increasingly important role in architectural theory, reflected, for example, in the works of Vitruvius. According to this proportion, Vitruvius (3, 3, 1 ff) distinguished between five different design concepts and temple types:

- Pyknostyle, tight-columned: intercolumnium = 1 1/2 lower column diameters
- Systyle, close-columned: intercolumnium = 2 lower column diameters
- Eustyle, well-columned: intercolumnium = 2 1/4 lower column diameters
- Diastyle, board-columned: interkolumnium = 3 lower column diameters
- Araeostyle, light-columned: intercolumnium = 3 1/2 lower column diameters

The determination and discussion of these basic principles went back to Hermogenes, whom Vitruvius credits with the invention of the eustylos. The Temple of Dionysos at Teos, normally ascribed to Hermogenes, does indeed have intercolumnia measuring 2 1/6 of the lower column diameters.

== Optical refinements ==
To loosen up the mathematical strictness and to counteract distortions of human visual perception, a slight curvature of the whole building, hardly visible with the naked eye, was introduced. The ancient architects had realised that long horizontal lines tend to make the optical impression of sagging towards their centre. To prevent this effect, the horizontal lines of stylobate and/or entablature were raised by a few centimetres towards the middle of a building. This avoidance of mathematically straight lines also included the columns, which did not taper in a linear fashion, but were refined by a pronounced "swelling" (entasis) of the shaft. Additionally, columns were placed with a slight inclination towards the centre of the building. Curvature and entasis occur from the mid 6th century onwards.

The most consistent use of these principles is seen in the Classical Parthenon on the Athenian Acropolis. Its curvature affects all horizontal elements up to the sima, even the naos walls reflect it throughout their height. The inclination of its columns (which also have a clear entasis), is continued by architrave and triglyph frieze, the external walls of the naos also reflect it. Not one block of the building, not a single architrave or frieze element could be hewn as a simple rectilinear block. All architectural elements display slight variations from the right angle, individually calculated for each block. As a side effect, each preserved building block from the Parthenon, its columns, naos walls or entablature, can be assigned its exact position today. In spite of the immense extra effort entailed in this perfection, the Parthenon, including its sculptural decoration, was completed in the record time of sixteen years (447 to 431).

== Decoration ==
=== Colouring ===
Only three basic colours were used: white, blue and red, occasionally also black. The crepidoma, columns, and architrave were mostly white. Only details, like the horizontally cut grooves at the bottom of Doric capitals (annuli), or decorative elements of Doric architraves (e.g. taenia and guttae) might be painted in different colours. The frieze was clearly structured by use of colours. In a Doric triglyph frieze, blue triglyphs alternated with red metopes, the latter often serving as a background for individually painted sculptures. Reliefs, ornaments, and pedimental sculptures were executed with a wider variety of colours and nuances. Recessed or otherwise shaded elements, like mutules or triglyph slits could be painted black. The paint was mostly applied to parts that were not load-bearing, whereas structural parts like columns or the horizontal elements of architrave and geison were left unpainted (if made of high-quality limestone or marble) or covered with a white stucco.

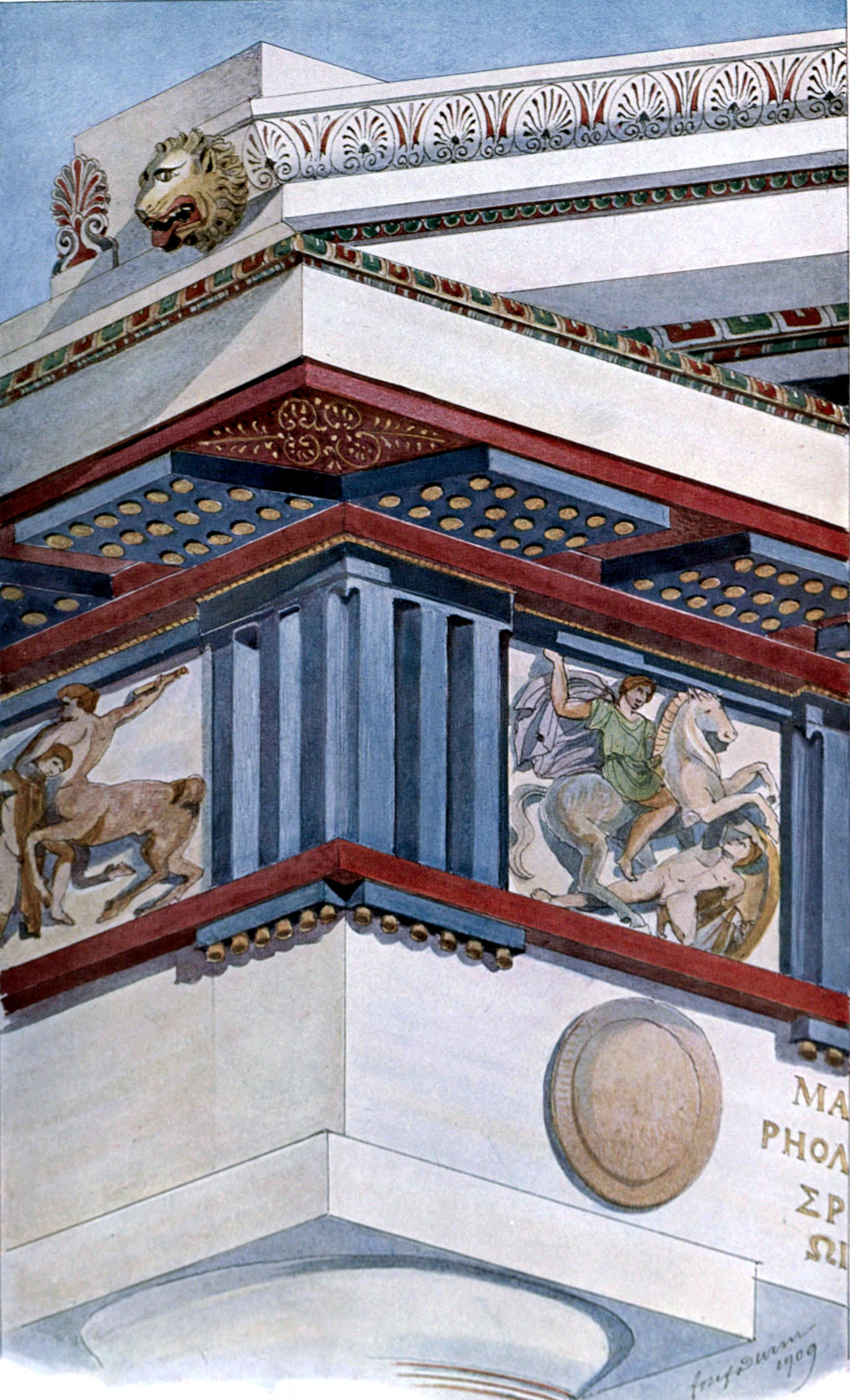
Original Doric polychromy

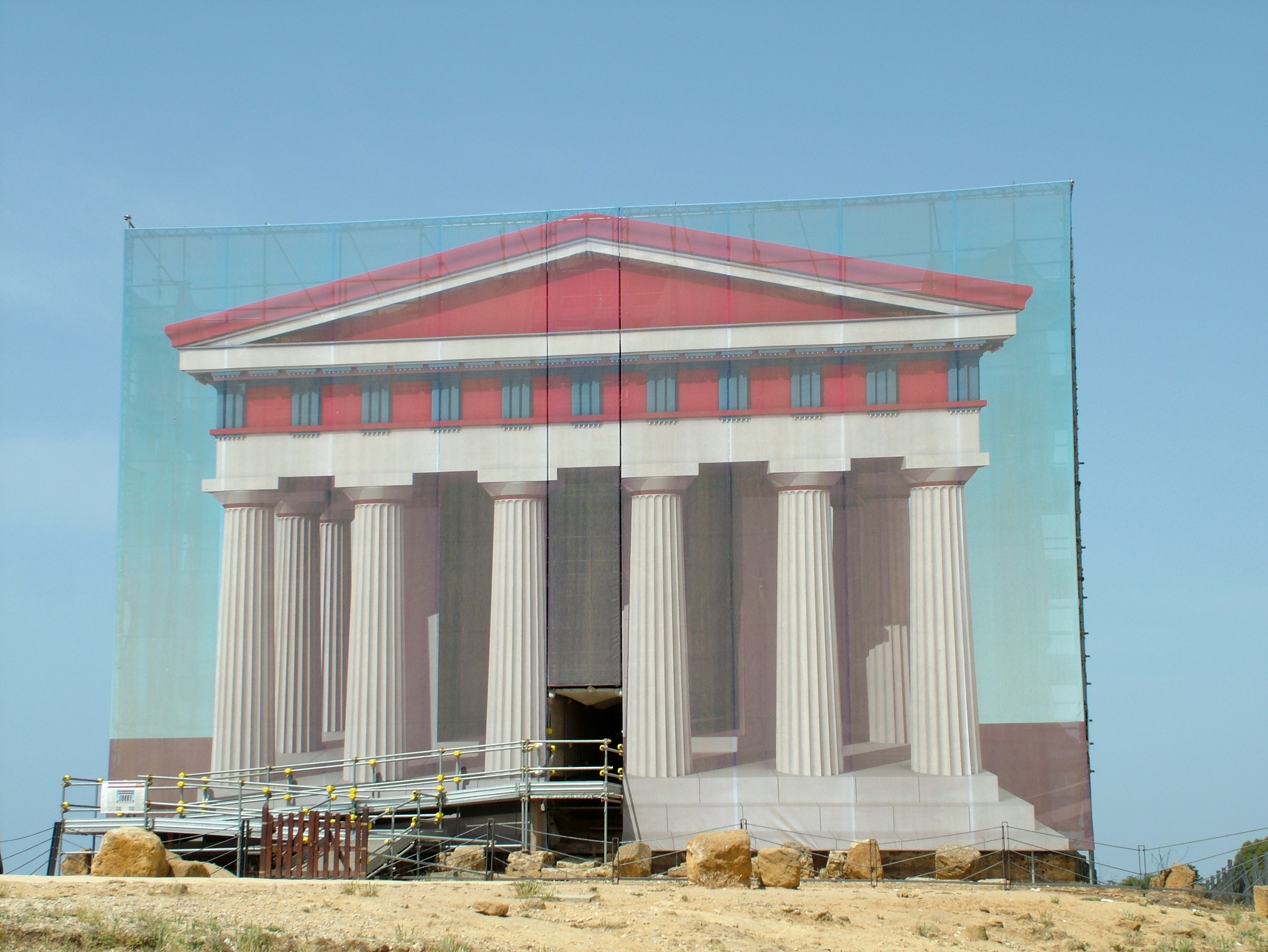
Panel painted on the scaffolding of the Temple of Concordia site from Agrigento in 2006

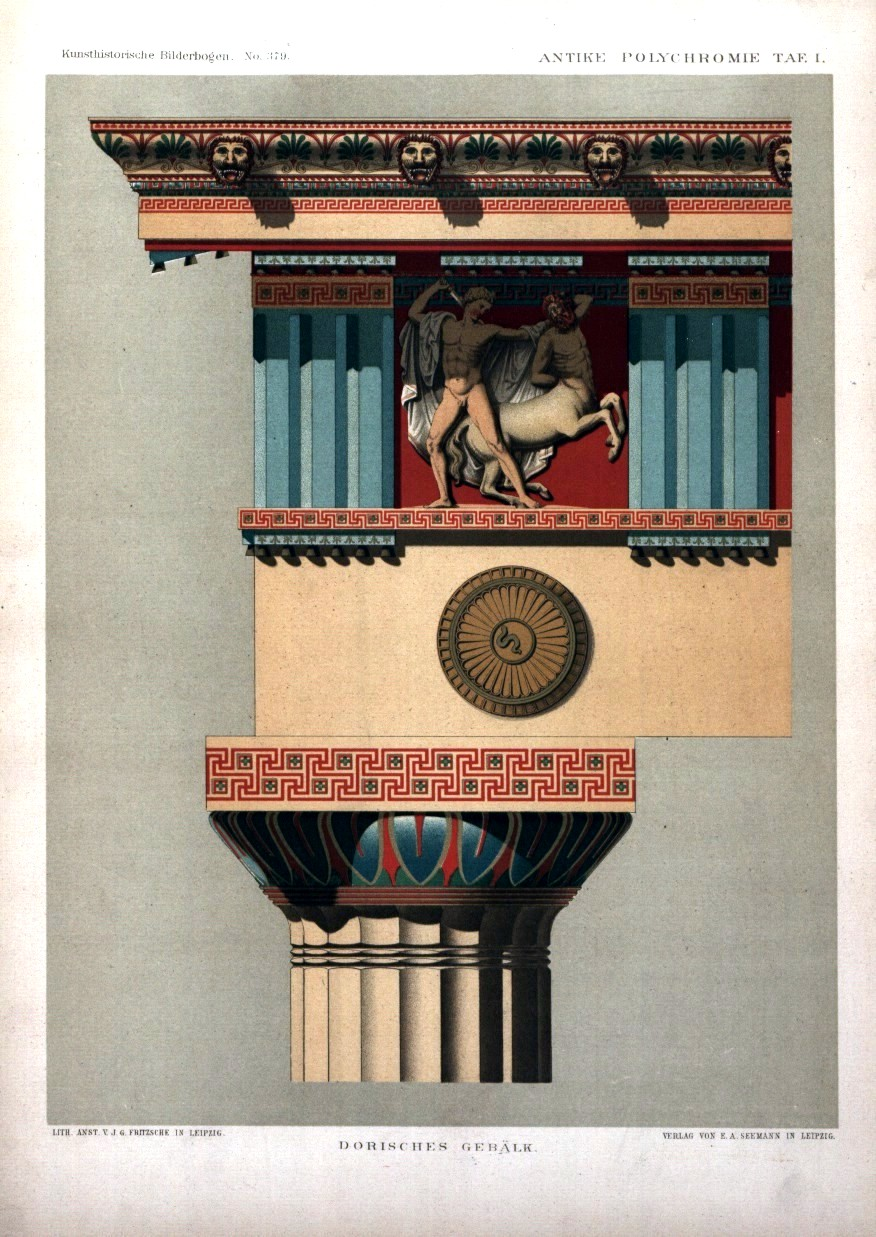
1883 reconstruction of color scheme of the entablature on a Doric temple

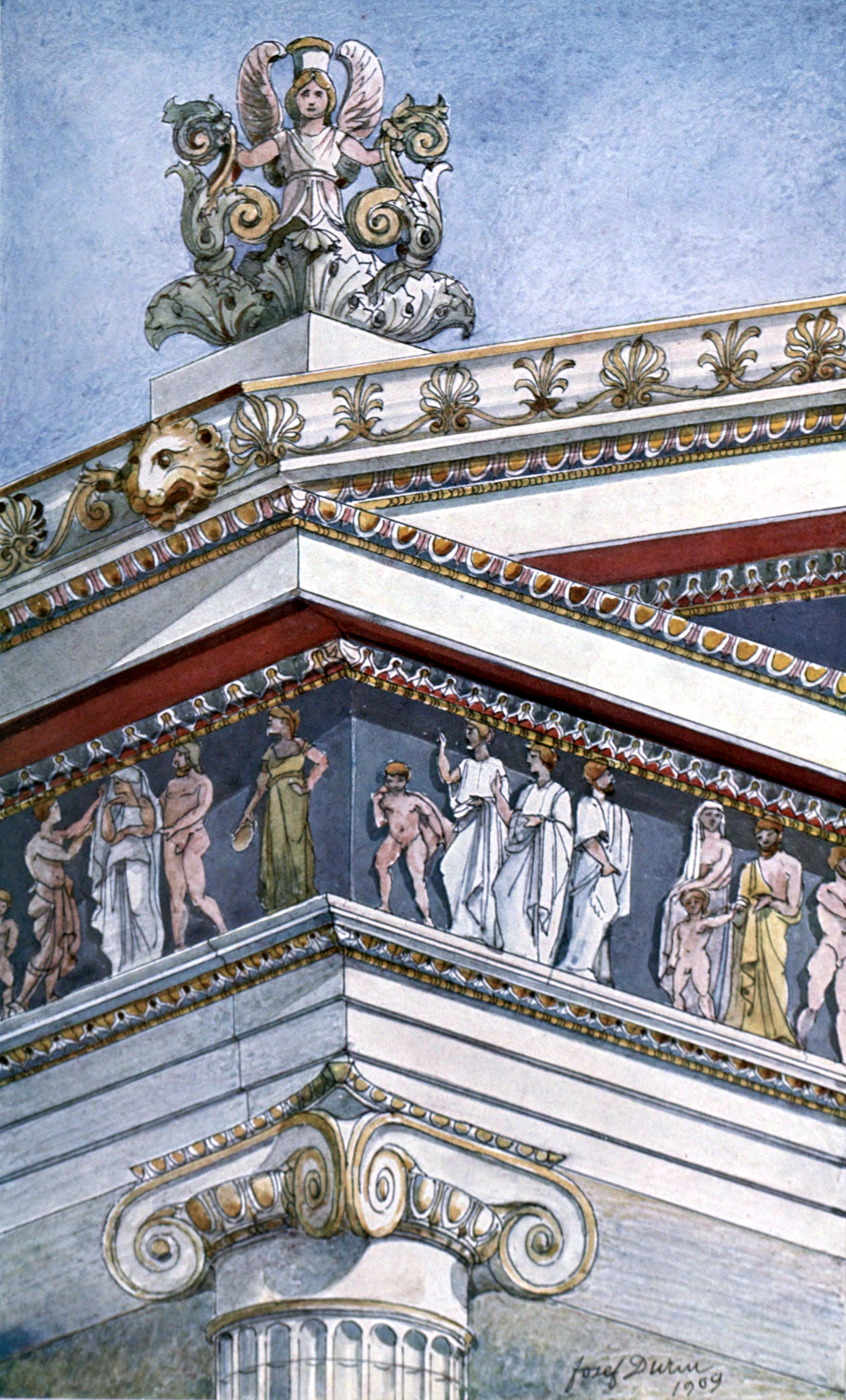
Original polychromy of Ionic temples

=== Architectural sculpture ===
Greek temples were often enhanced with figural decorations. especially the frieze areas offered space for reliefs and relief slabs; the pedimental triangles often contained scenes of free-standing sculpture. In Archaic times, even the architrave could be relief-decorated on Ionic temples, as demonstrated by the earlier temple of Apollo at Didyma. Here, the architrave corners bore gorgons, surrounded by lions and perhaps other animals. On the other hand, the Ionic temples of Asia Minor did not possess a separate frieze to allow space for relief decoration. The most common area for relief decoration remained the frieze, either as a typical Doric triglyph frieze, with sculpted metopes, or as a continuous frieze on Cycladic and later on Eastern Ionic temples.

==== Metopes ====
The metopes, separate individual tableaux that could usually not contain more than three figures each, usually depicted individual scenes belonging to a broader context. It is rare for scenes to be distributed over several metopes; instead, a general narrative context, usually a battle, is created by the combination of multiple isolated scenes. Other thematical contexts could be depicted in this fashion. For example, the metopes at the front and back of the Temple of Zeus at Olympia depicted the Twelve Labours of Heracles. Individual mythological scenes, like the abduction of Europa or a cattle raid by the Dioscuri could be thus depicted, as could scenes from the voyage of the Argonauts or the Trojan War. The battles against the centaurs and Amazons, as well as the gigantomachy, all three depicted on the Parthenon, were recurring themes on many temples.

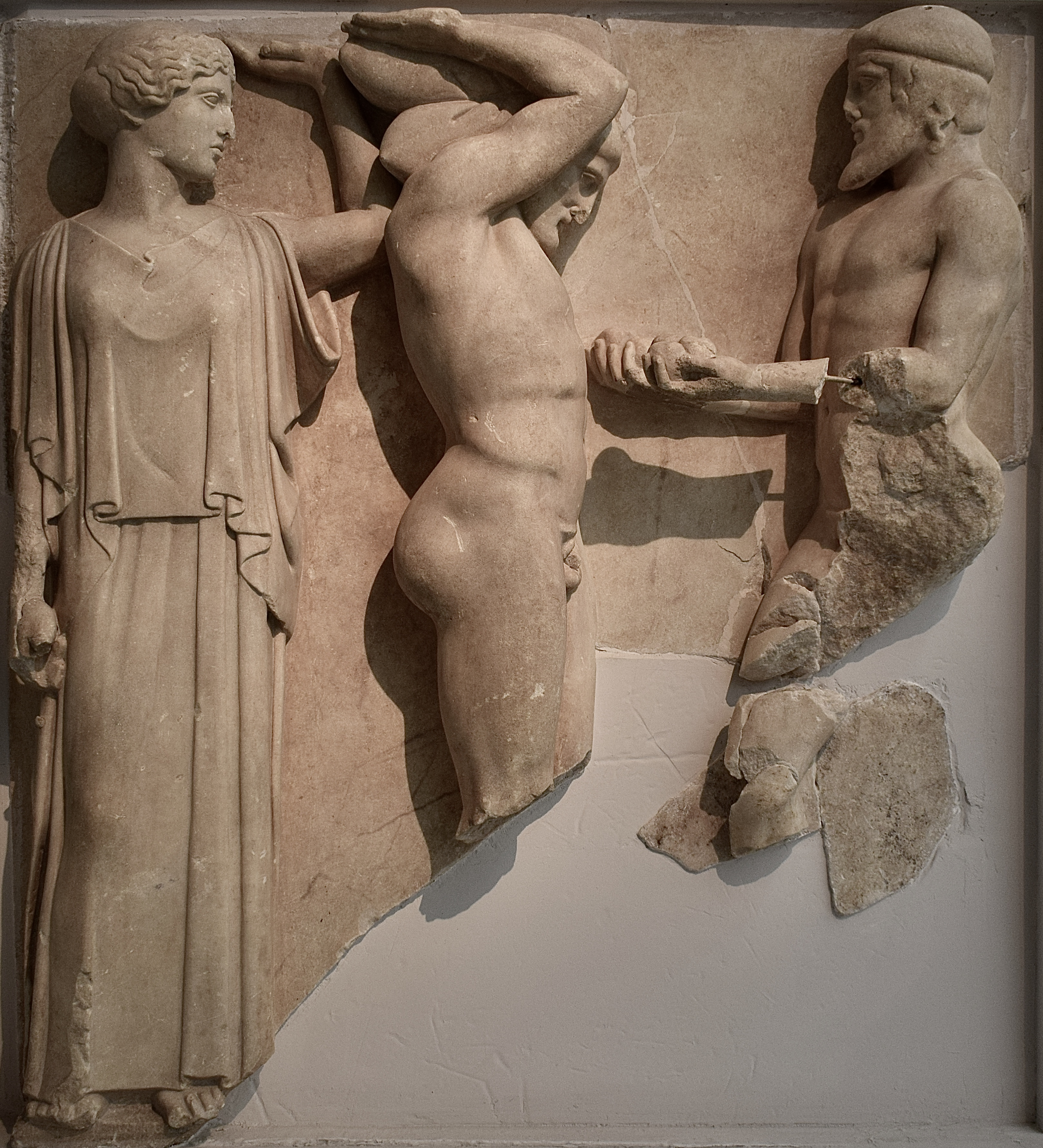
Metope from the Temple of Zeus from Olympia

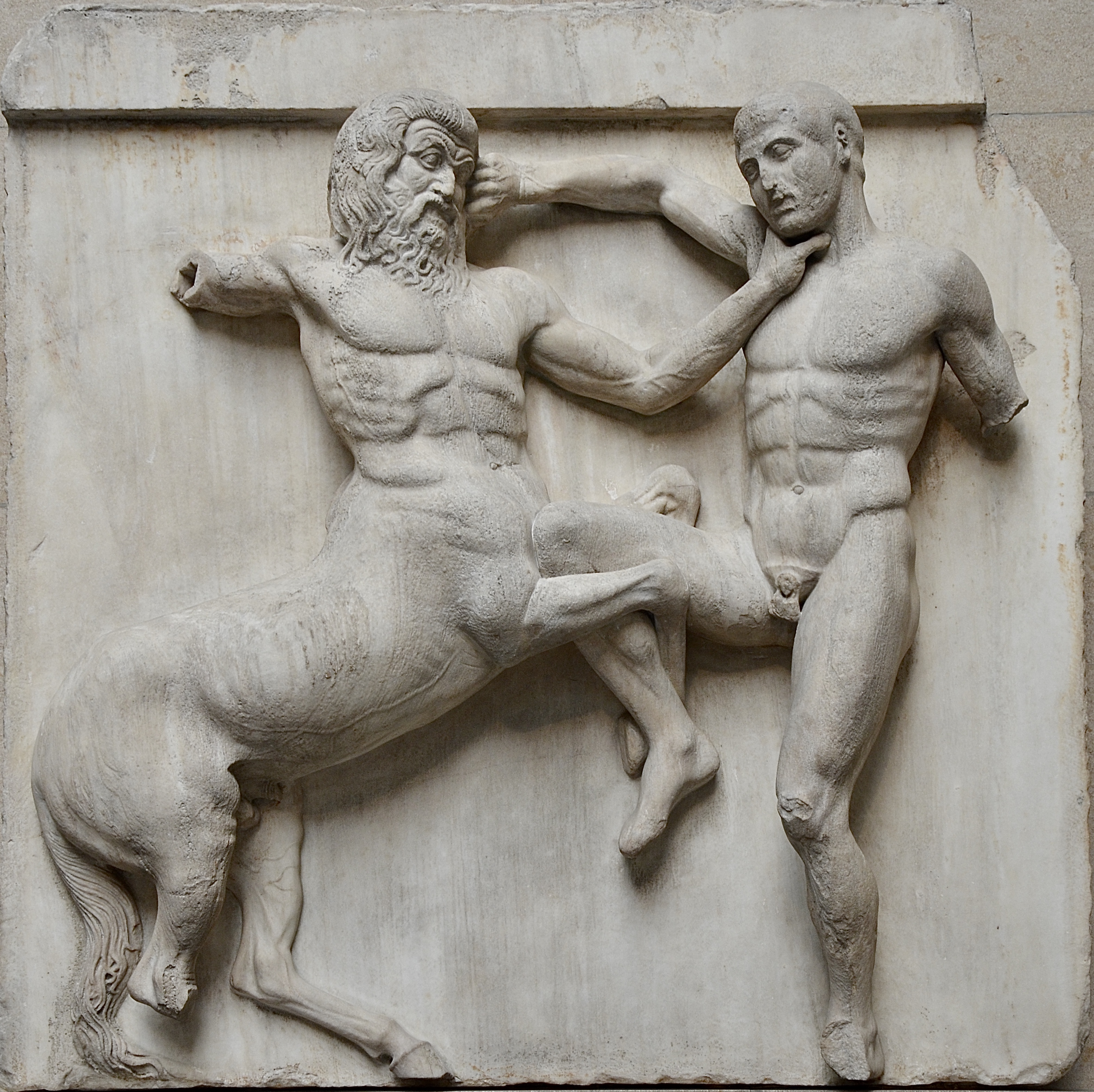
A centaur struggling with a Lapith on a metope from the Parthenon, in the British Museum (London)

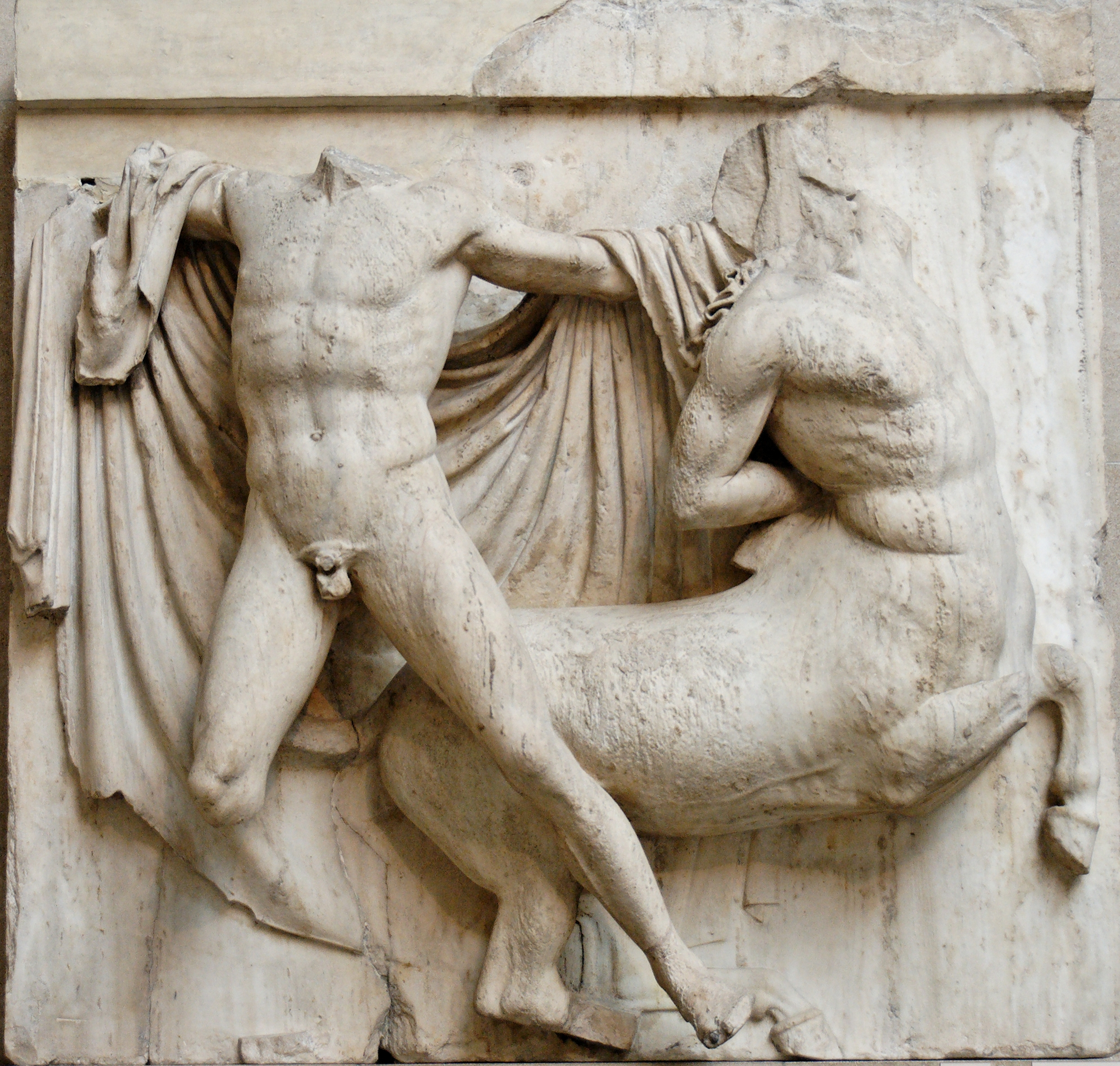
Lapith fighting a centaur on a metope from the Parthenon, in the British Museum

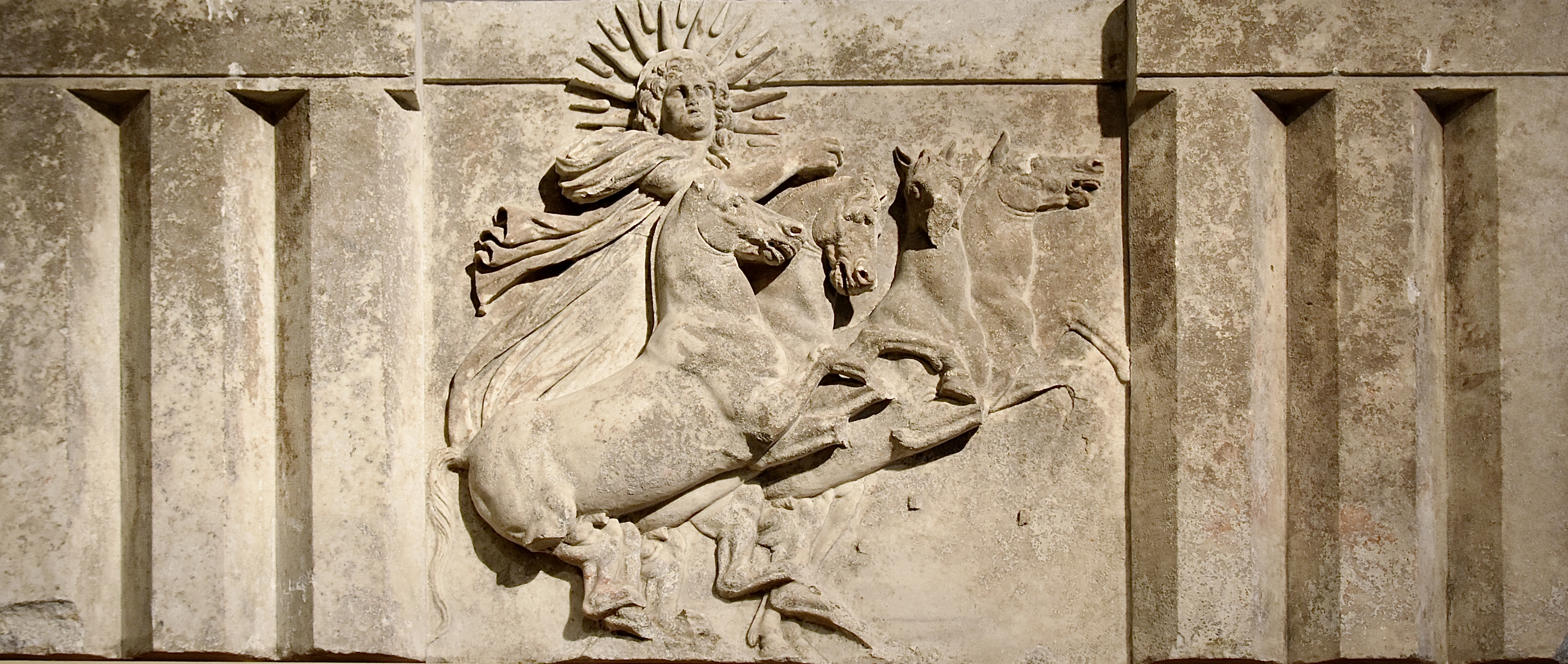
Architrave with sculpted metope showing sun god Helios in a quadriga, from the Temple of Athena at Troy, circa 300–280 BC

==== Friezes ====
Battle scenes of all kinds were also a common theme of Ionic friezes, e.g. the Gigantomachy on the temple of Hekate at Lagina, or the Amazonomachy on the temple of Artemis at Magnesia on the Maeander, both from the late 2nd century BC. Complex compositions visualised the back and forth of fighting for the viewer. Such scenes were contrasted by more quiet or peaceful ones: The Assembly of the gods and a procession dominate the 160 m long frieze that is placed on top of the naos walls of the Parthenon.

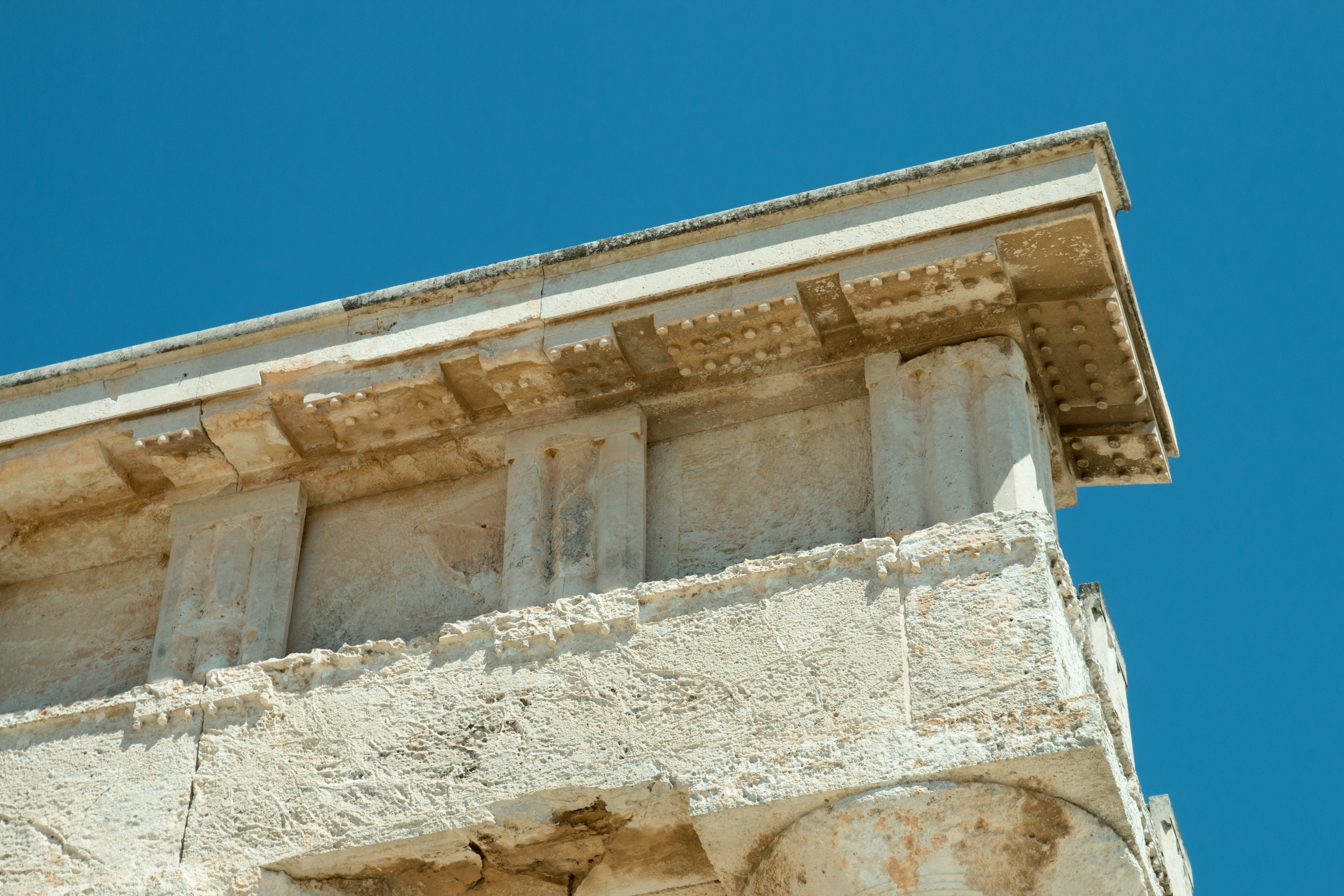
Doric frieze of the Temple of Aphaea from Aegina (Greece), with triglyphs and metopes

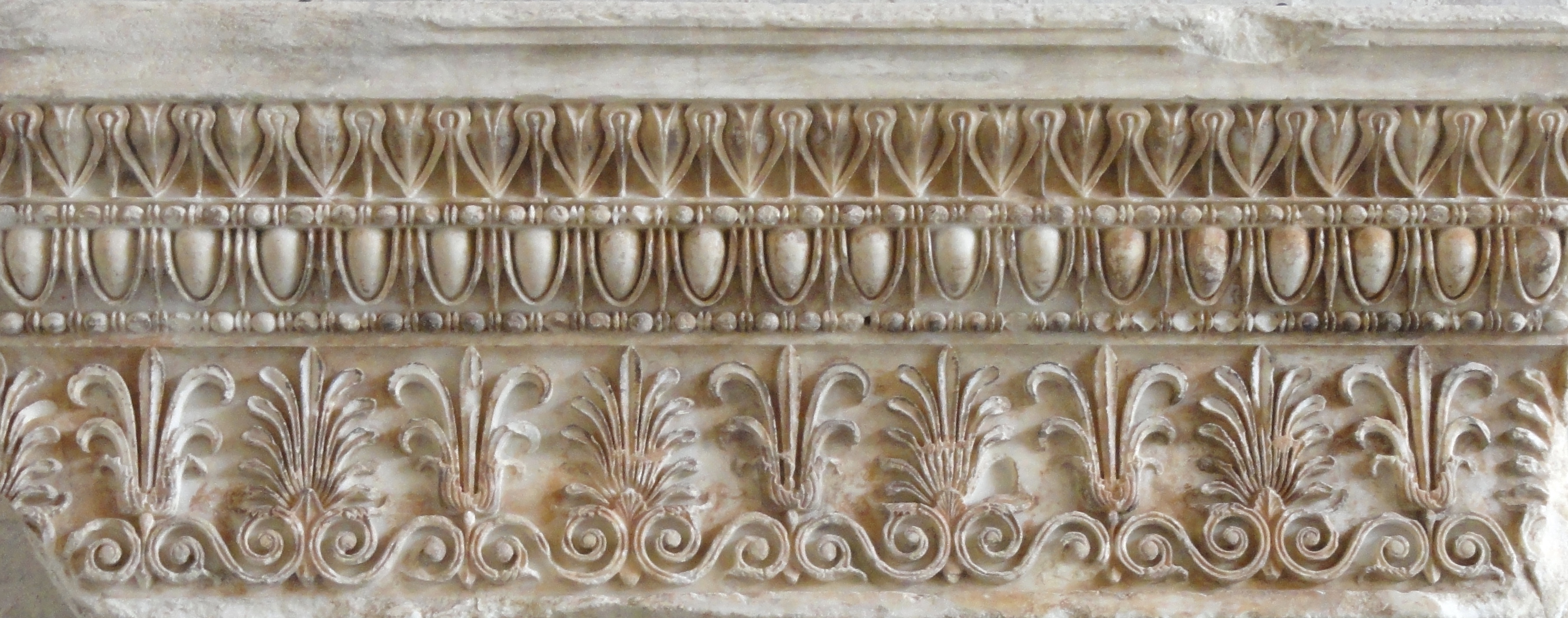
Ionic frieze from the Erechtheum, in the Glyptothek (Munich, Germany)

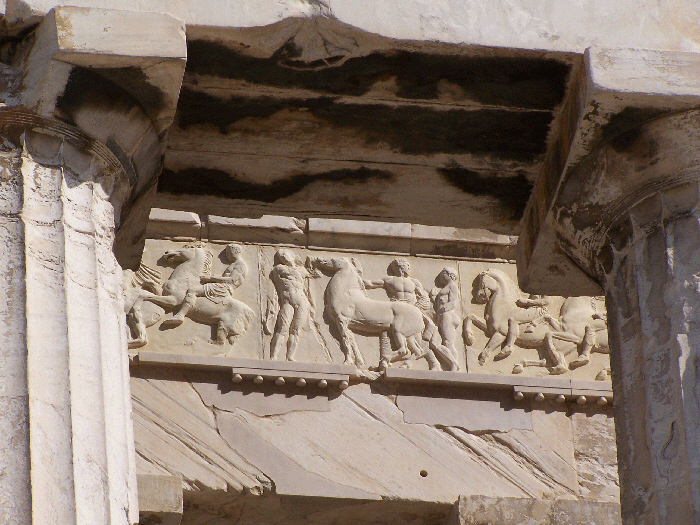
Part of the Parthenon Frieze, in situ on the west side of the naos

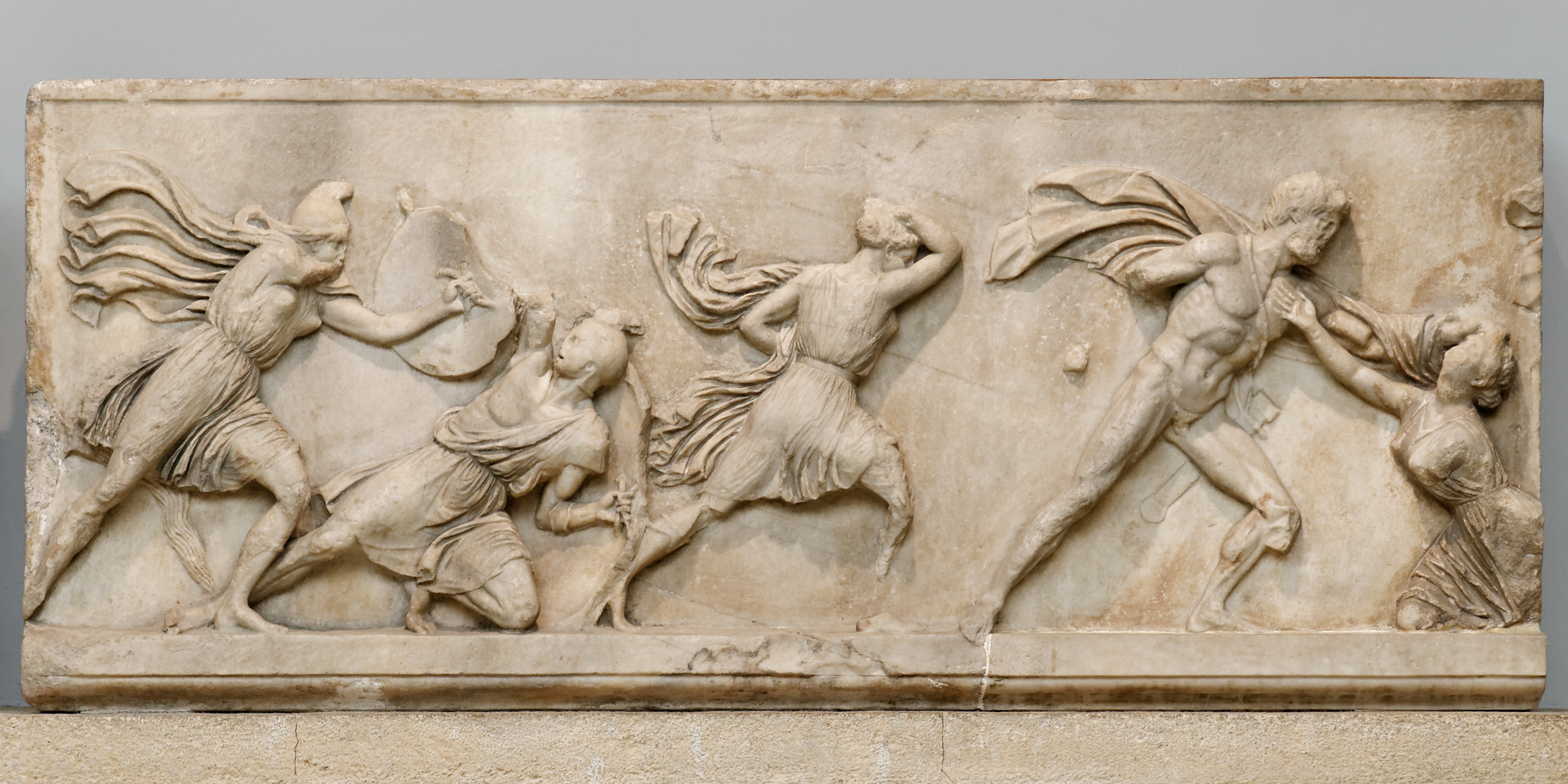
Detail of the frieze with Amazonomachy from the Mausoleum at Halicarnassus, in the British Museum (London)

==== Pediments ====
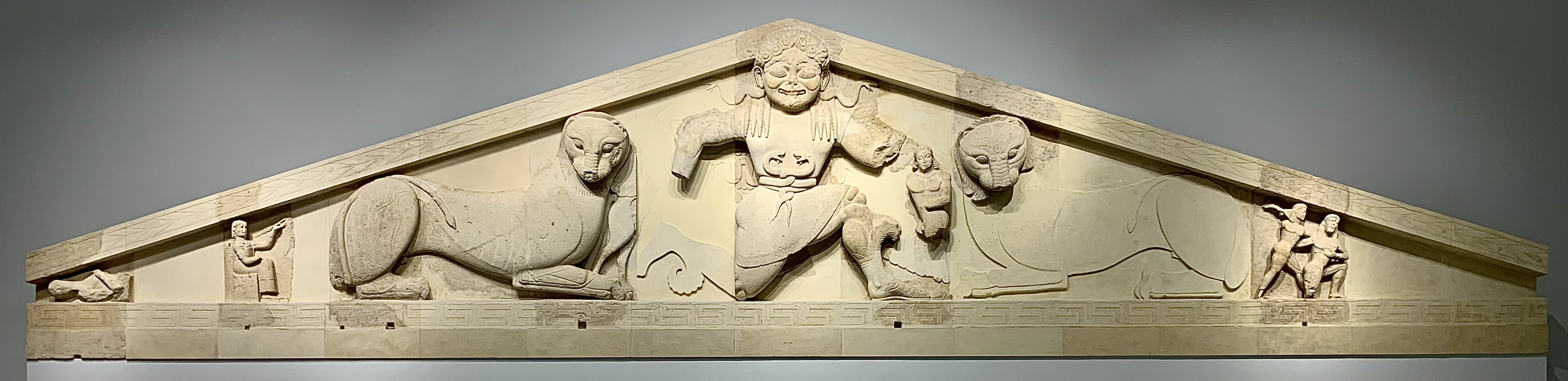
The west pediment from the Temple of Artemis in Corfu (Greece), in the Archaeological Museum of Corfu

Special attention was paid to the decoration of the pediments, not least because of their size and frontal position. Pedimental sculpture was originally in massive relief figures, as in the earliest to survive, from shortly after 600, on the temple of Artemis at Kerkyra, where the west pediment is taken up by the gorgon Medusa and her children at the centre, flanked by panthers. Smaller scenes are displayed in the low corners of the pediments, including Zeus with a thunderbolt, fighting a Giant.

The pedimental sculpture of the first peripteral temple on the Athenian Acropolis, from c. 570, is nearly free-standing sculpture, but remains dominated by a central scene of fighting lions. Again, the corners contain separate scenes, including Heracles fighting Triton. After the mid-6th century, the compositional scheme changes: animal scenes are now placed in the corners, soon they disappear entirely. The central composition is now taken over by mythological fights or by rows of human figures, and the figures become free-standing, as in the Elgin Marbles from the Parthenon.

The high regard in which the Greeks held pedimental sculptures is demonstrated by the discovery of the sculptures from the Late Archaic temple of Apollo at Delphi, which had received a veritable burial after the temple's destruction in 373. The themes of the individual pedimental scenes are increasingly dominated by myths connected with the locality. Thus, the east pediment at Olympia depicts the preparations for a chariot race between Pelops and Oinomaos, the mythical king of nearby Pisa. It is the foundation myth of the sanctuary itself, displayed here in its most prominent position. A similarly direct association is provided by the birth of Athena on the east pediment of the Parthenon, or the struggle for Attica between her and Poseidon on its west pediment. The pediment of the later temple of the Kabeiroi at Samothrace, late 3rd century, depicted a probably purely local legend, of no major interest to Greece as a whole.

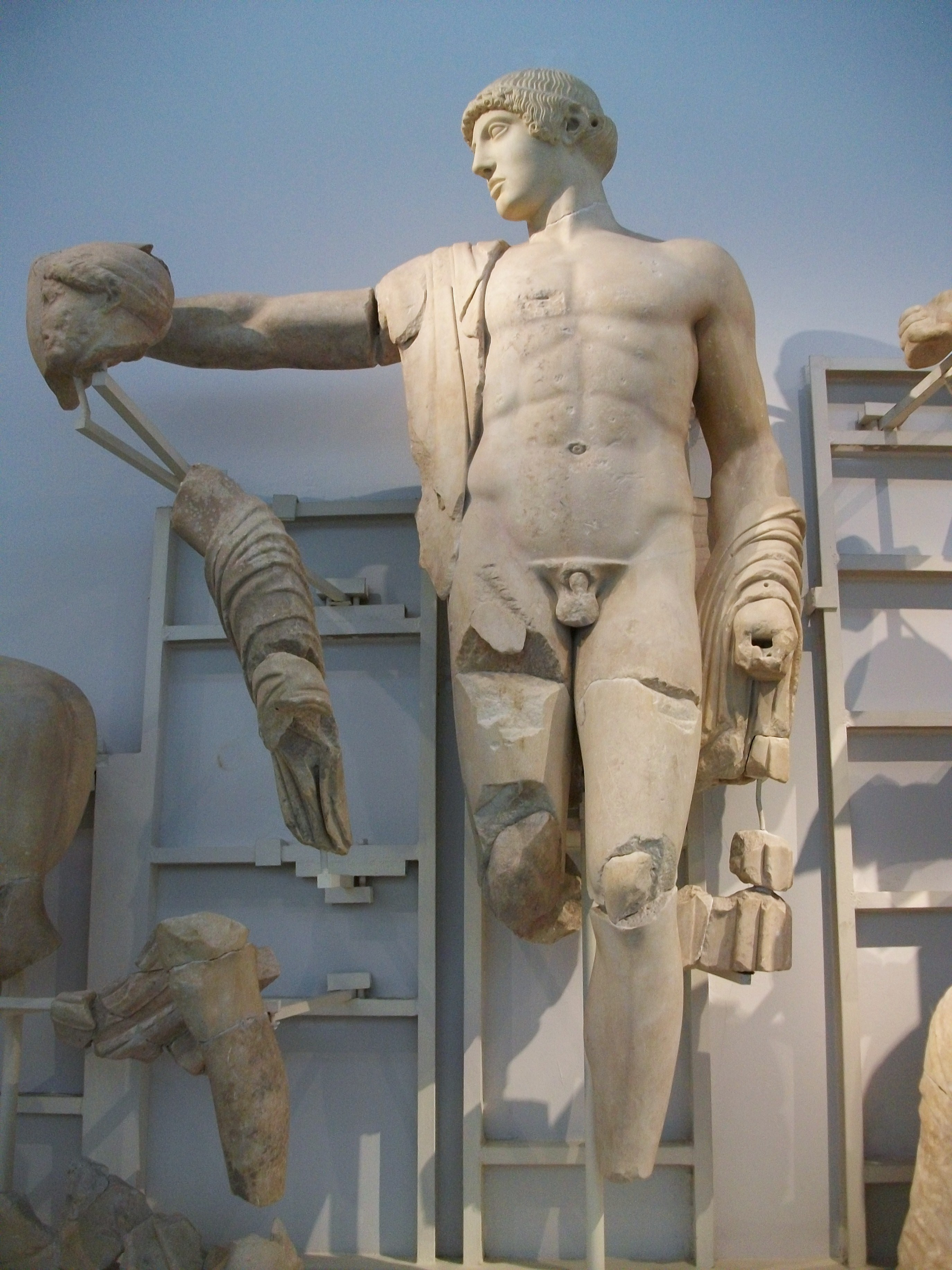
Statue of Apollo from the west pediment of the Temple of Zeus at Olympia

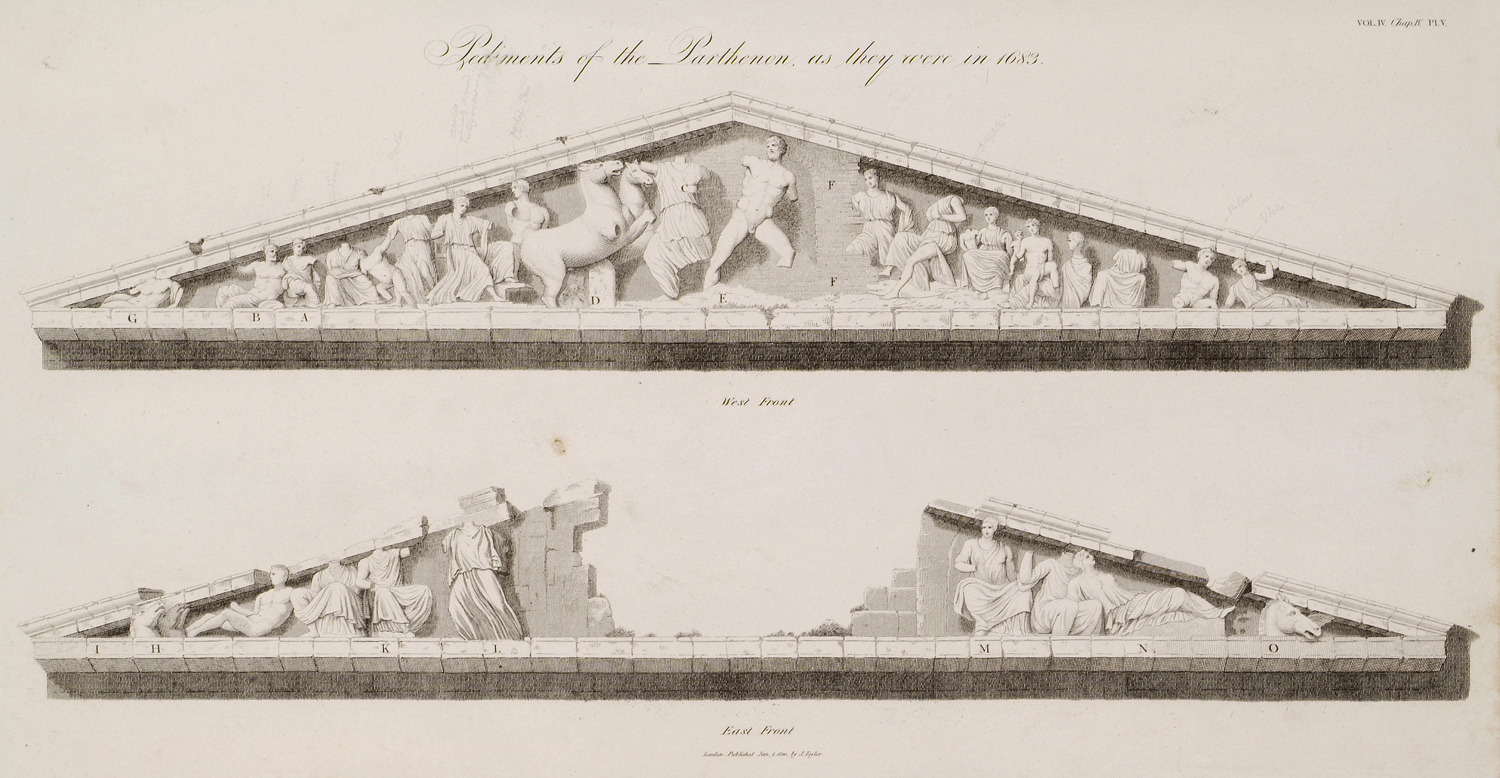
Illustrations with the sculptures of the two pediments of the Parthenon, by James Stuart & Nicholas Revett in 1794

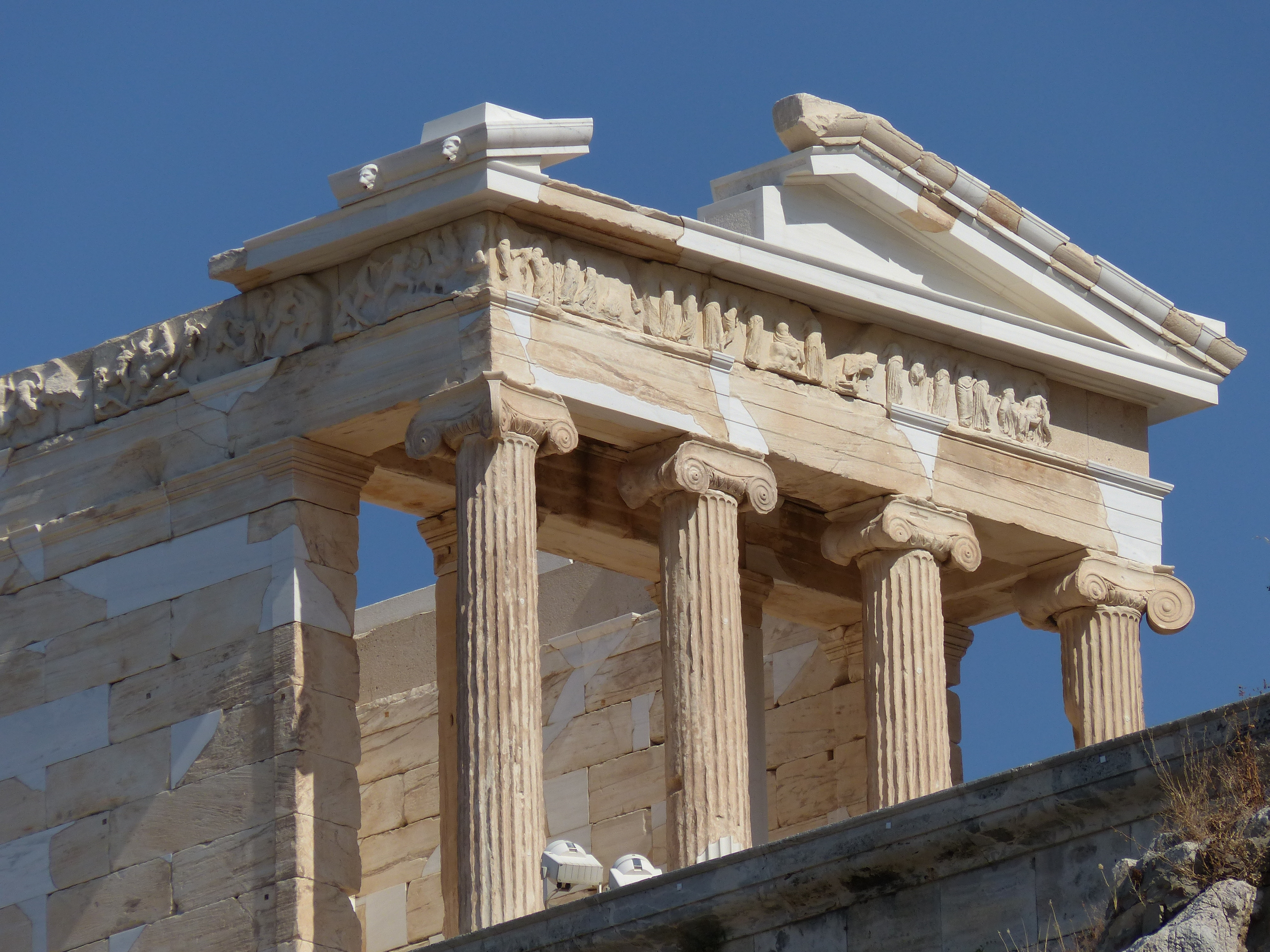
The Temple of Athena Nike with its very damaged pediments

==== Roofs ====
The roofs were crowned by acroteria, originally in the form of elaborately painted clay disks, from the 6th century onwards as fully sculpted figures placed on the corners and ridges of the pediments. They could depict bowls and tripods, griffins, sphinxes, and especially mythical figures and deities. For example, depictions of the running Nike crowned the Alcmaeonid temple of Apollo at Delphi, and mounted amazons formed the corner akroteria of the temple of Asklepios in Epidauros. Pausanias (5, 10, 8) describes bronze tripods forming the corner akroteria and statues of Nike by Paeonios forming the ridge ones on the Temple of Zeus at Olympia.

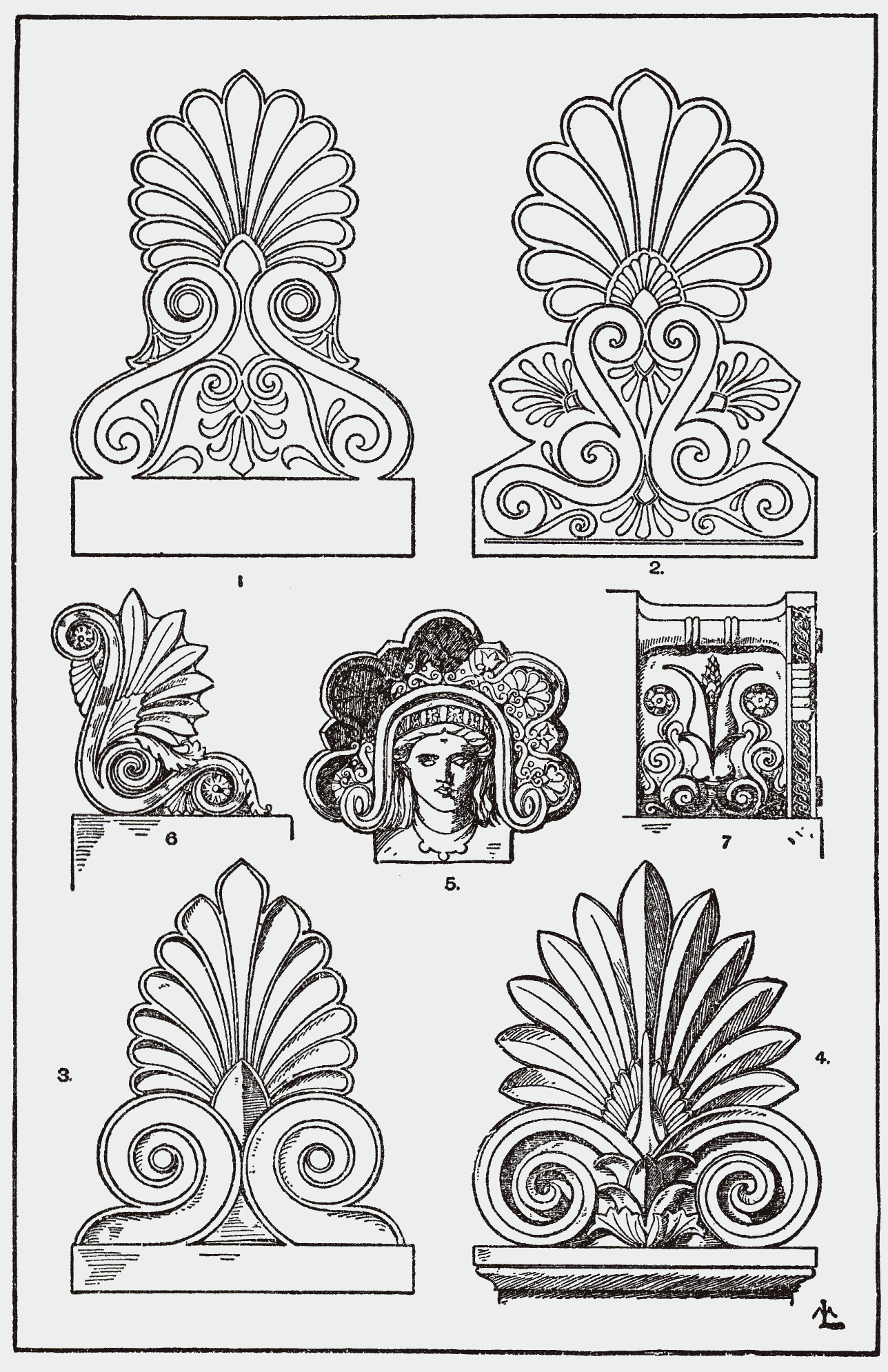
Illustrations with examples of acroteria

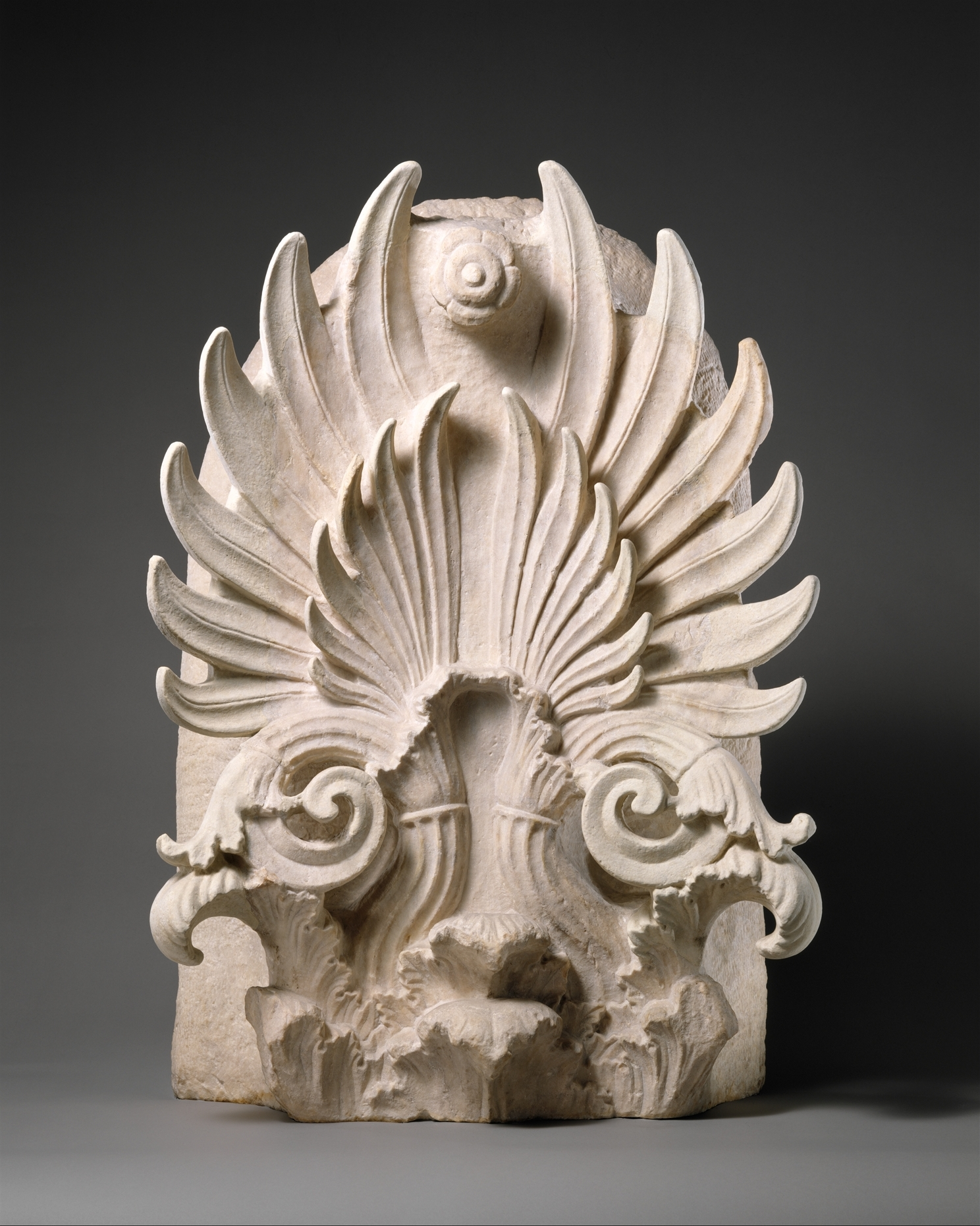
Akroterion, 350-325 BC, marble, in the Metropolitan Museum of Art (New York City)

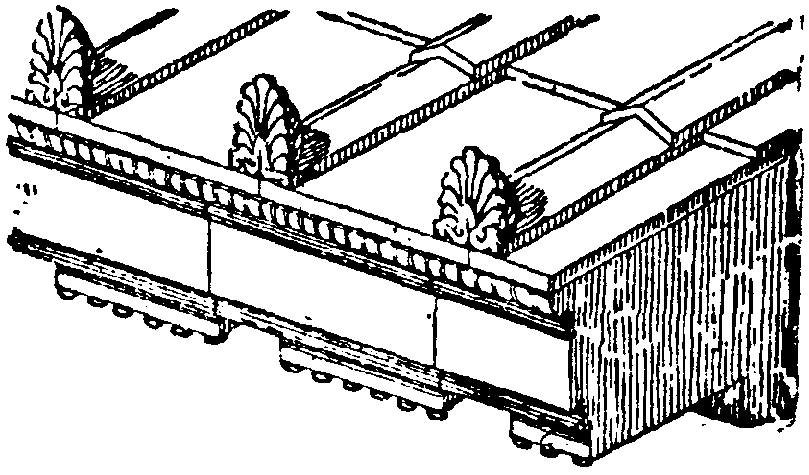
Illustration which shows antefixes in position

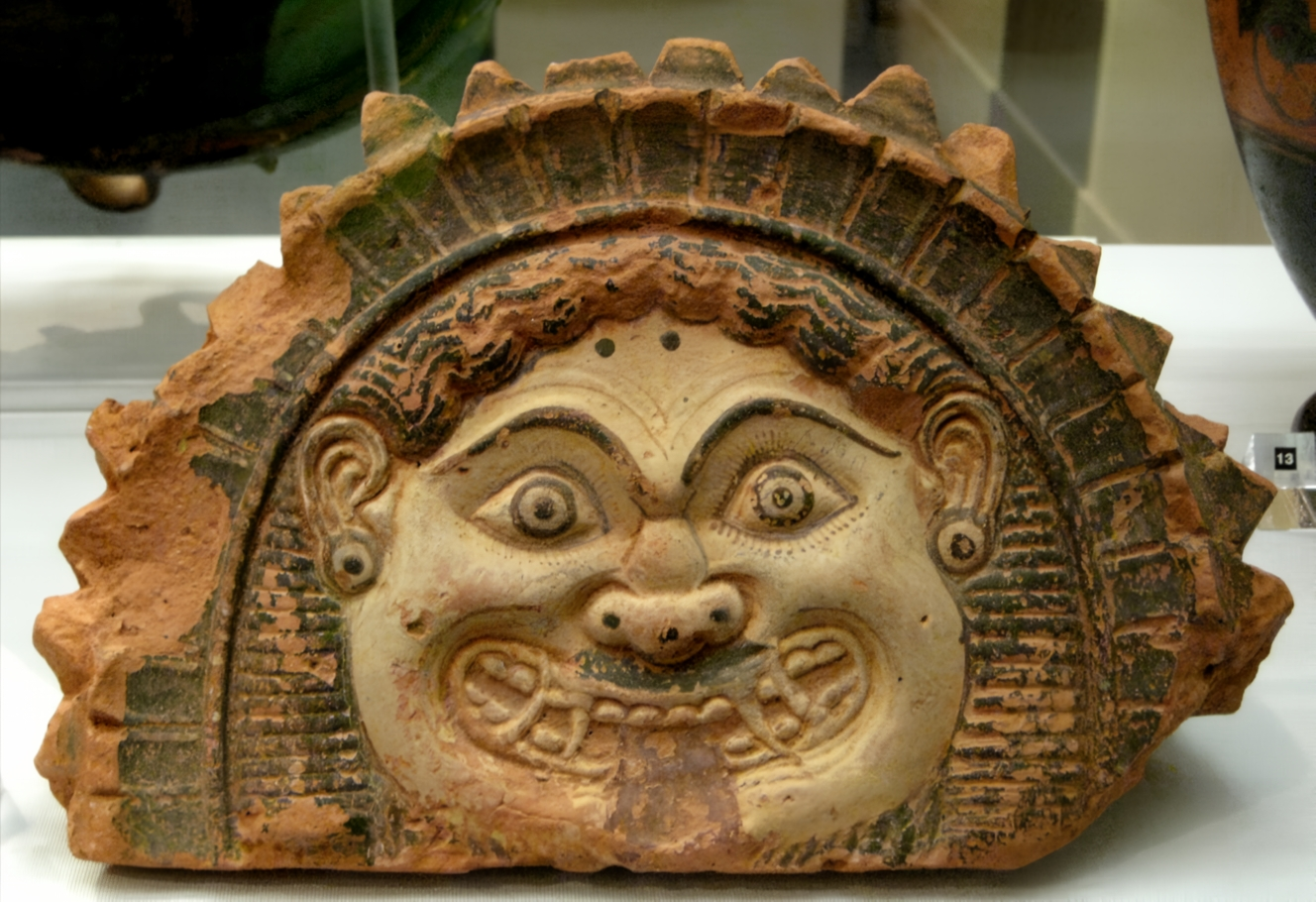
Antefix with Medusa, 6th or 5th centuries BC, ceramic, Pushkin Museum (Moscow)

==== Columns ====
For the sake of completeness, a further potential bearer of sculptural decoration should be mentioned here: the columnae celetae of the Ionic temples at Ephesos and Didyma. Here, already on the Archaic temples, the lower parts of the column shafts were decorated by protruding relief decorations, originally depicting rows of figures, replaced on their late Classical and Hellenistic successors with mythological scenes and battles.

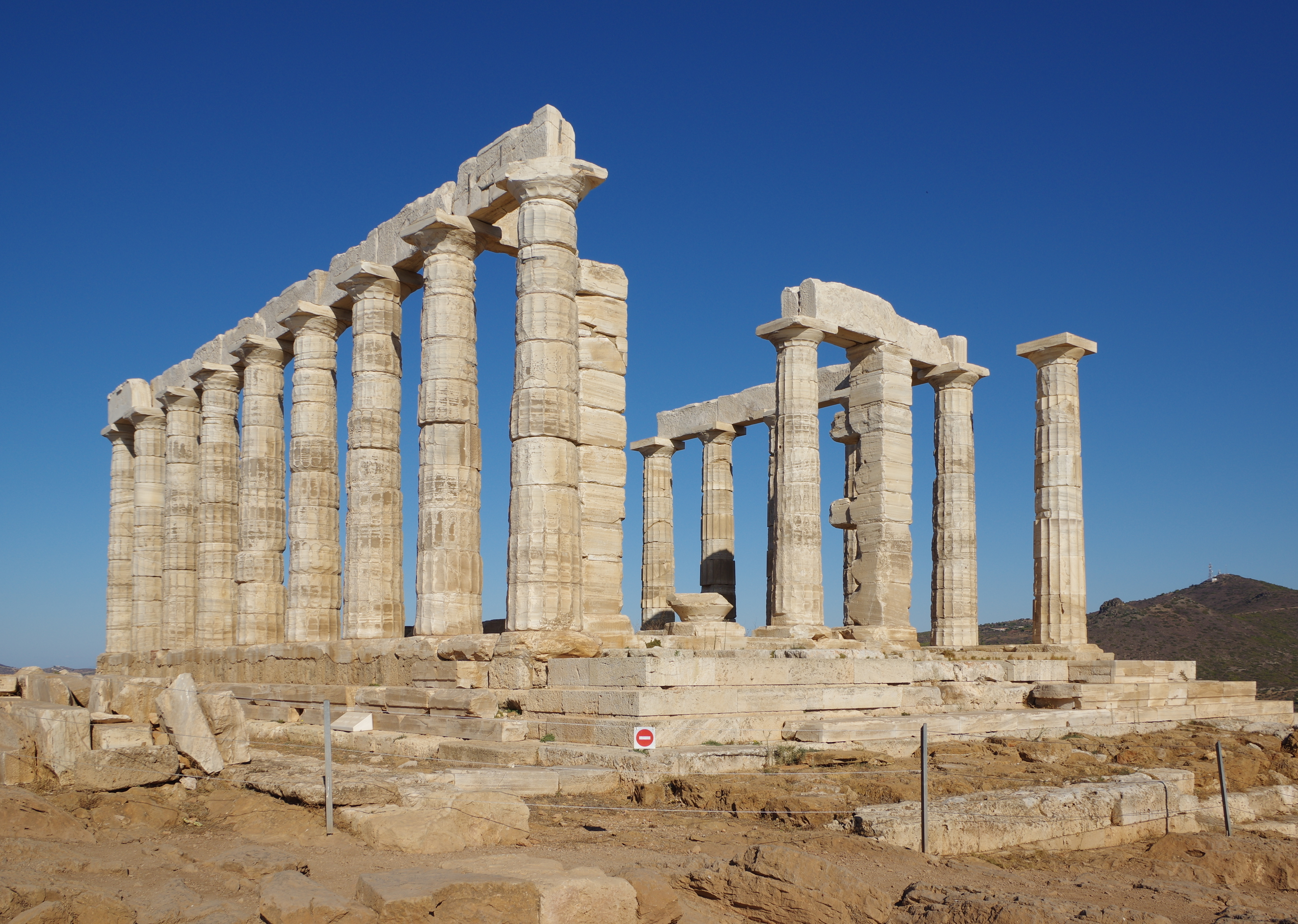
The ruins of the Temple of Poseidon from Sounion (Greece), 444–440 BC

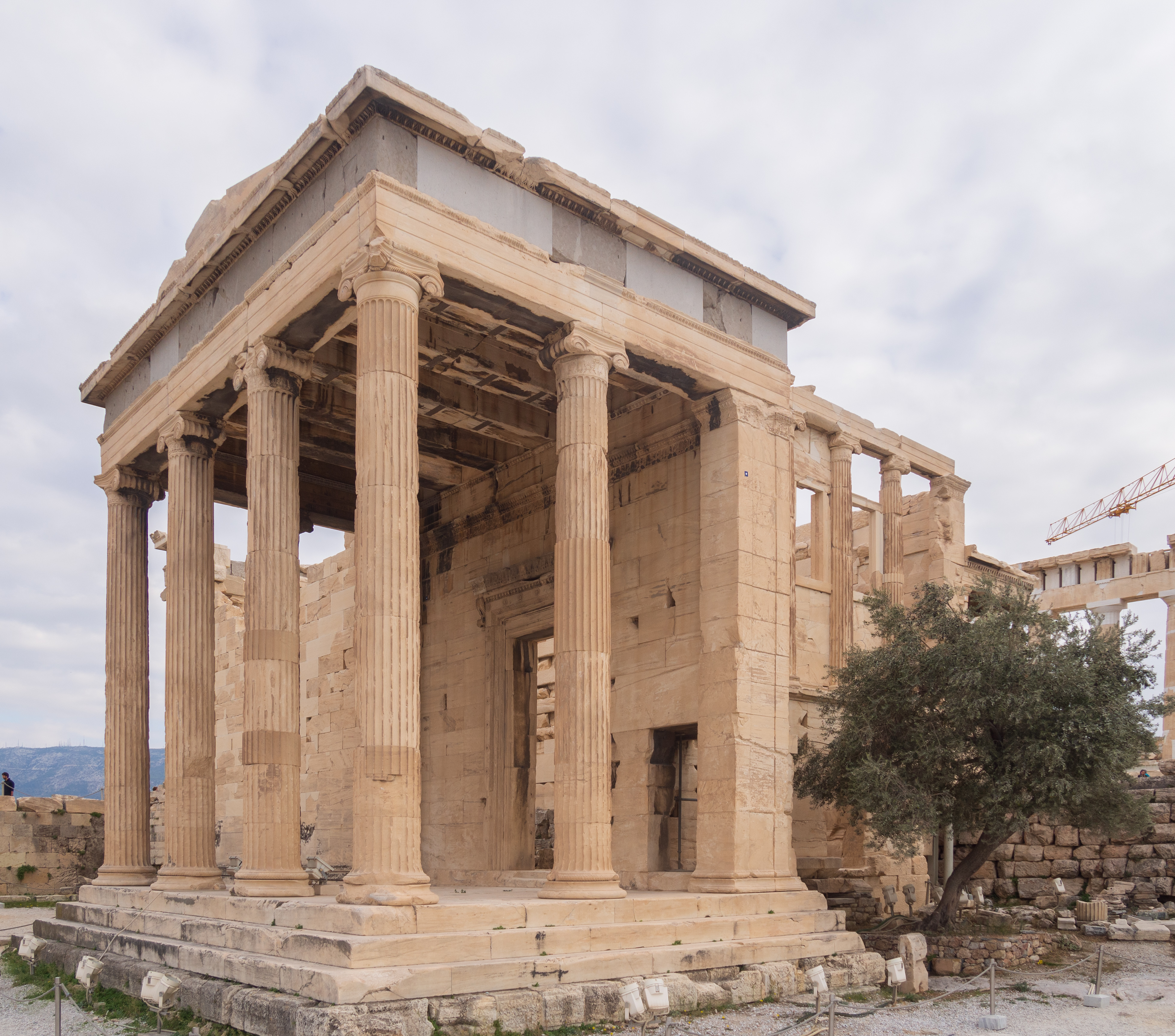
The North Porch of the Erechtheum from the Acropolis of Athens

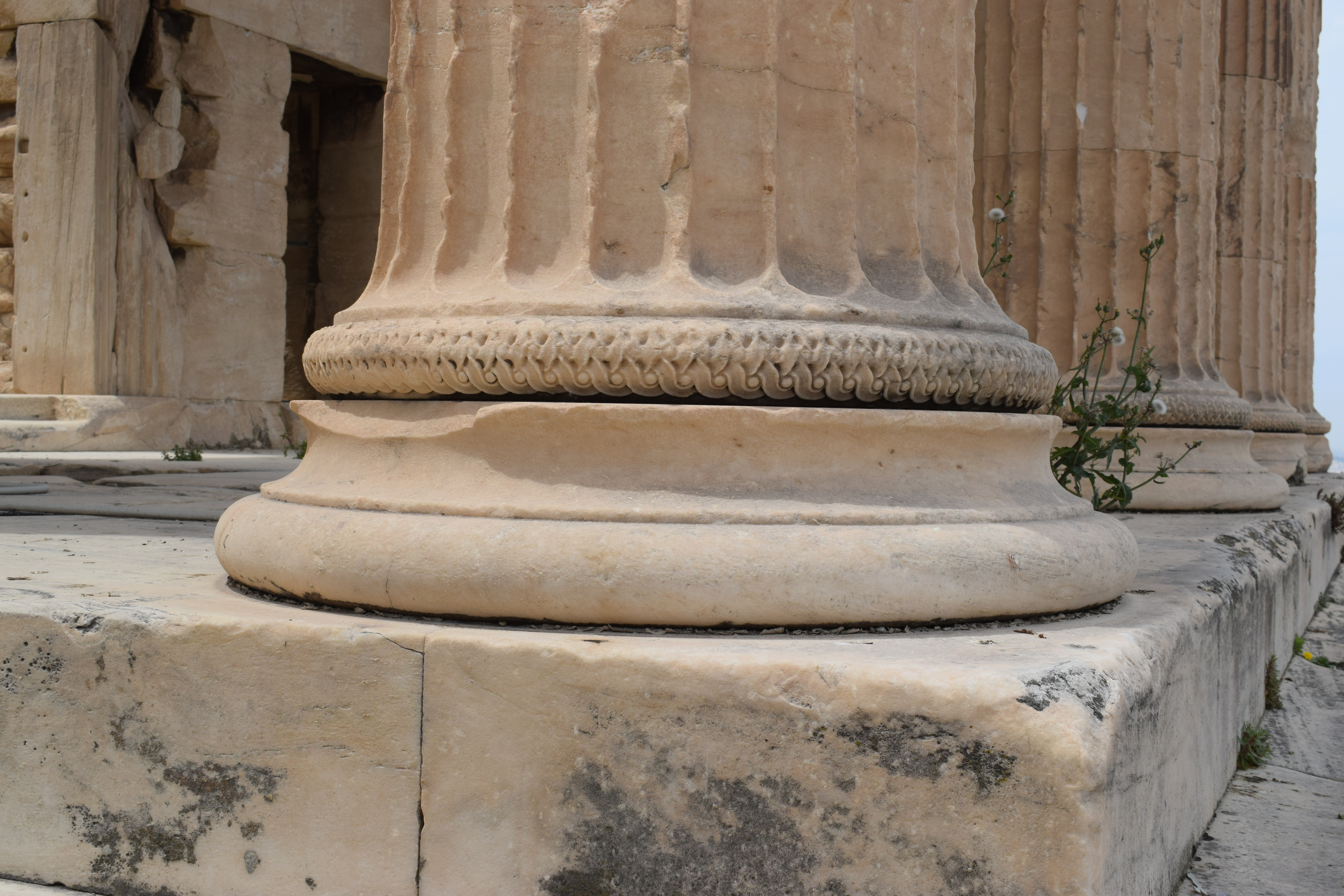
Base of an Ionic column of the North Porch of the Erechtheum

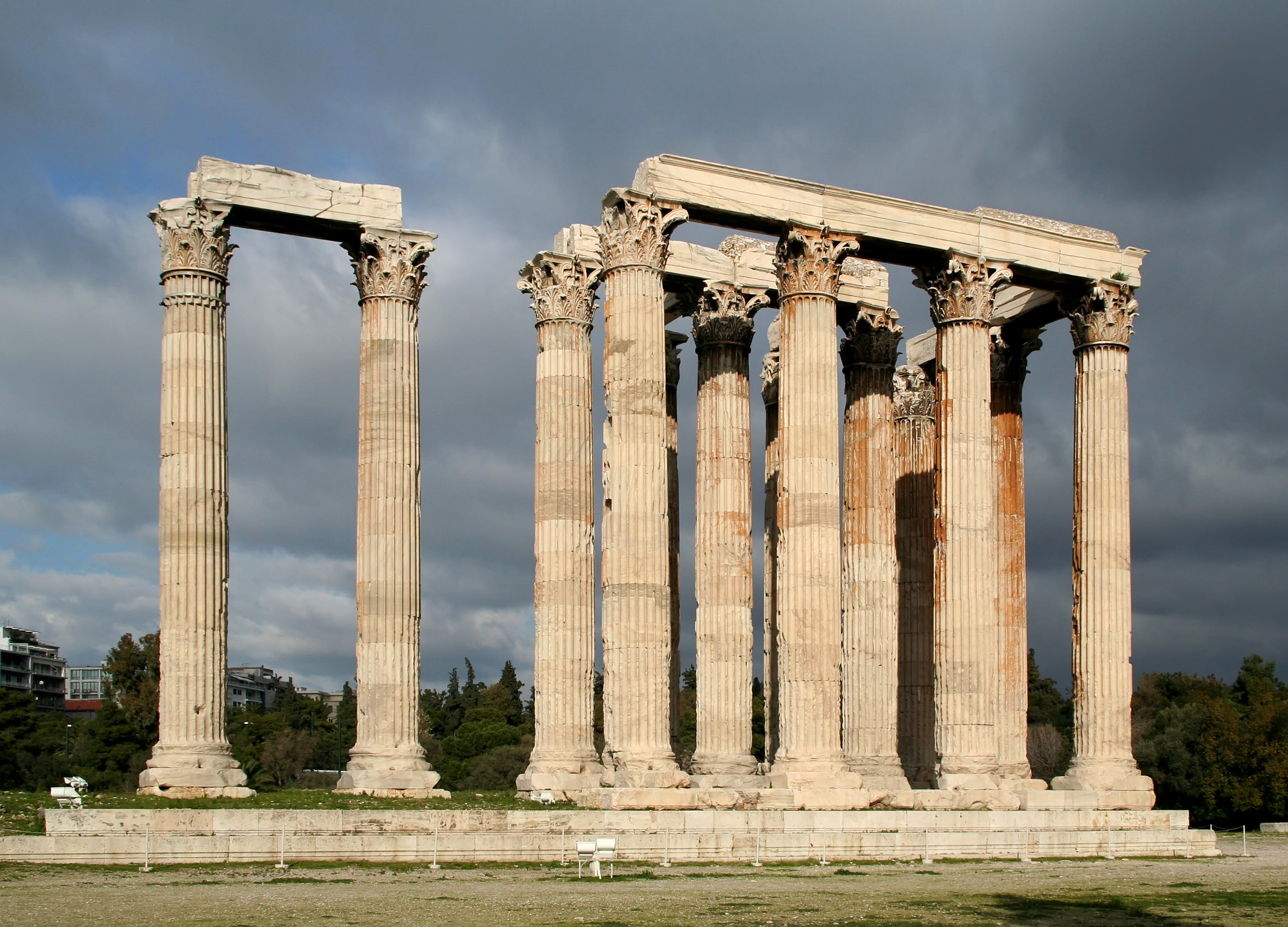
The ruins of the Temple of Olympian Zeus from Athens

== Function and design ==
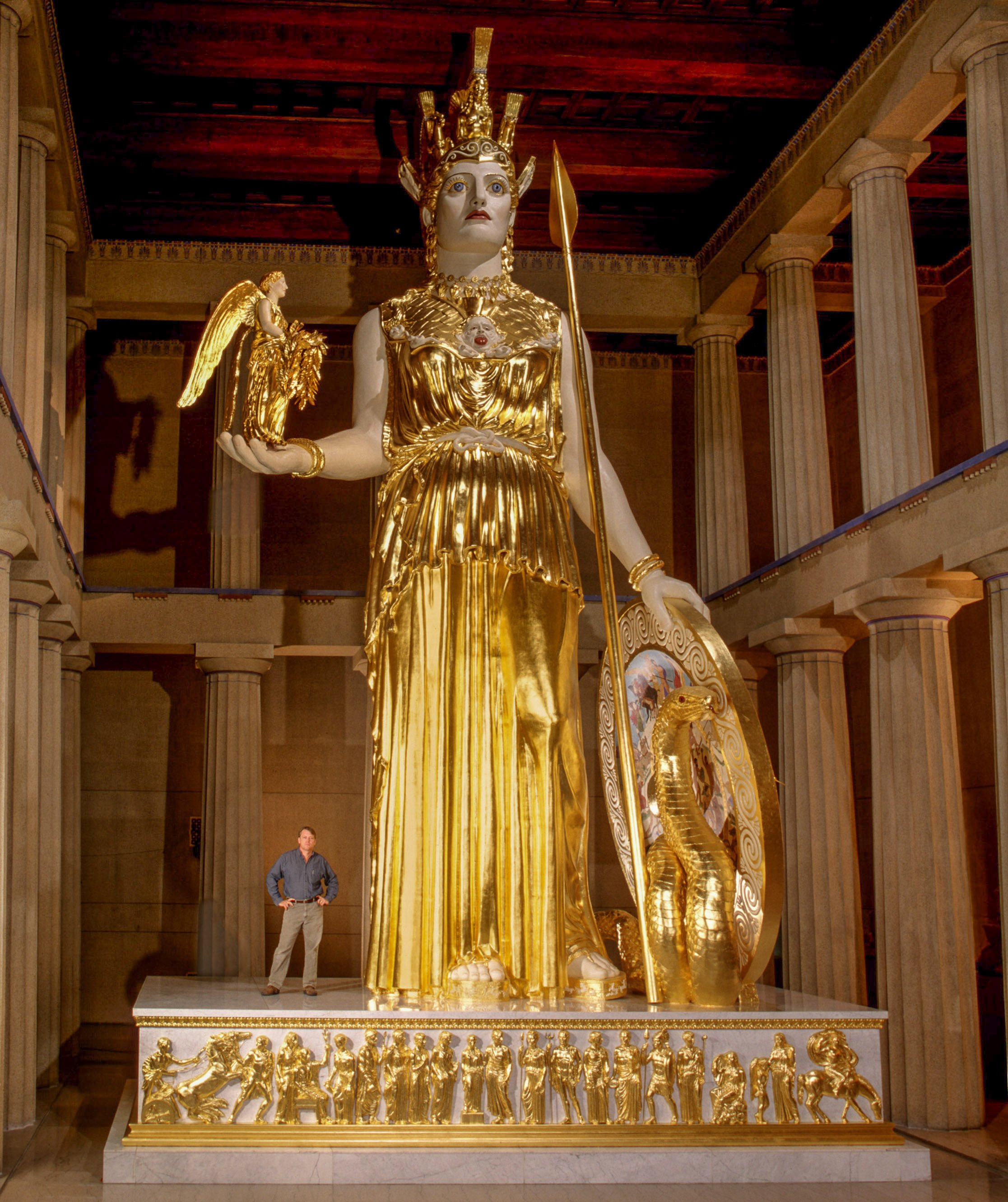
Reproduction of the Athena Parthenos cult image at the original size in the Parthenon in Nashville, Tennessee, United States.

=== Cult statue and naos ===
The functions of the temple mainly concentrated on the naos, the "dwelling" of the cult statue. The elaboration of the temple's external aspects served to stress the dignity of the naos. In contrast, the naos itself was often finished with some moderation, although by the Roman period some had clearly become rather cluttered with other statues, military trophies and other gifts. Often, the only source of light for naoi and cult statue was the naos's frontal door, and oil lamps within. Thus, the interior only received a limited amount of light. Exceptions are found in the temples of Apollo at Bassae and of Athena at Tegea, where the southern naos wall had a door, potentially allowing more light into the interior. A special situation applies to the temples of the Cyclades, where the roof was usually of marble tiles. Marble roofs also covered the temple of Zeus at Olympia and the Parthenon at Athens. As marble is not entirely opaque, those naoi may have been permeated with a distinctive diffused light.

For cultic reasons, but also to use the light of the rising sun, virtually all Greek temples were oriented with the main door to the east. Another reason for the orientation of temples facing east is because of the west was seen as the entrance to the Underworld, such as seen in the Odyssey. Some exceptions existed, e.g. the west-facing temples of Artemis at Ephesos and at Magnesia on the Maeander, or the north–south oriented temples of Arcadia. Such exceptions are probably connected with cult practice. Study of the soils around temple sites, is evidence that temple sites were chosen with regard to particular deities: for example, amid arable soils for the agricultural deities Dionysos and Demeter, and near rocky soils for the hunter gatherer deities Apollo and Artemis.

The cult image normally took the form of a statue of the deity, typically roughly life-size, but in some cases many times life-size, in early days in wood, marble or terracotta, or in the specially prestigious form of a chryselephantine statue using ivory plaques for the visible parts of the body and gold for the clothes, around a wooden framework. The most famous Greek cult images were of this type, including the Statue of Zeus at Olympia, and Phidias's Athena Parthenos in the Parthenon in Athens, both colossal statues now completely lost. Fragments of two chryselephantine statues from Delphi have been excavated. Bronze cult images were less frequent, at least until Hellenistic times.

The acrolith was another composite form, this time a cost-saving one with a wooden body. A xoanon was a primitive and symbolic wooden image, perhaps comparable to the Hindu lingam; many of these were retained and revered for their antiquity. Many of the Greek statues well known from Roman marble copies were originally temple cult images, which in some cases, such as the Apollo Barberini, can be credibly identified. A very few actual originals survive, for example the bronze Piraeus Athena (2.35 metres high, including a helmet). The image stood on a base, from the 5th century often carved with reliefs.

==== Refinements ====
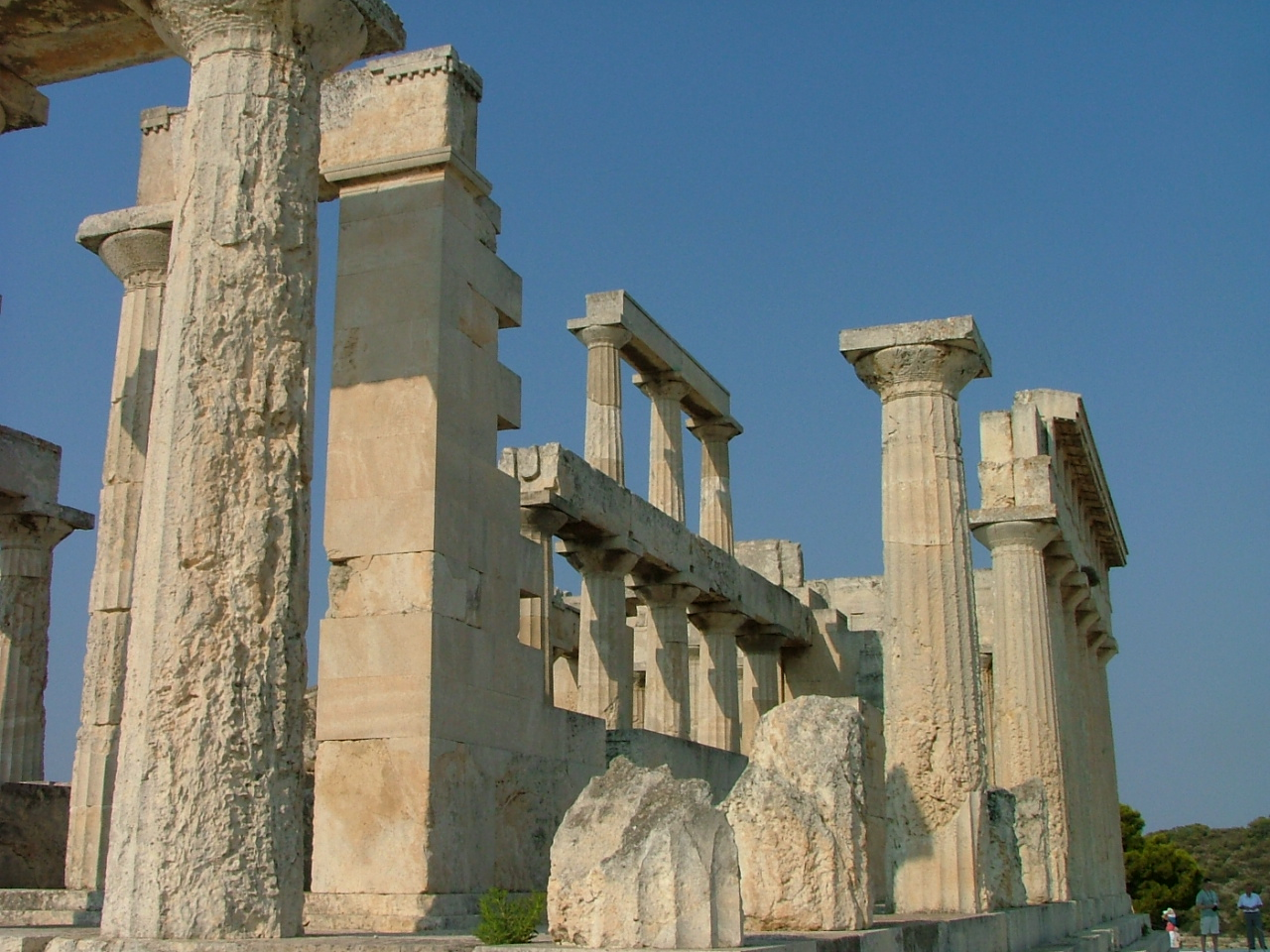
Temple of Aphaia, Aegina: The interior of the naos was embellished with two tiers of Doric columns.

The cult statue was often oriented towards an altar, placed axially in front of the temple. To preserve this connection, the single row of columns often found along the central axis of the naos in early temples was replaced by two separate rows towards the sides. The central one of the three aisles thereby created was often emphasised as the main one. The dignity of the central aisle of the naos could be underlined by the use of special elements of design. For example, the oldest known Corinthian capitals are from the naoi of Doric temples. The impressiveness of the internal aisle could be emphasised further by having a third row of columns along the back, as is the case at the Parthenon and at the temple of Zeus in Nemea. The Parthenon naos, also had another impressive feature, namely two tiers of columns atop each other, as did the temple of Aphaia on Aegina. The temple of Athena at Tegea shows another variation, where the two column rows are indicated by half-columns protruding from the side walls and crowned with Corinthian capitals. An early form of this solution can be seen at Bassae, where the central column of the back portico remains free-standing, while the columns along the sides are in fact semi-columns connected with the walls by curved protrusions.

Some famous temples, notably the Parthenon, the Temple of Zeus at Olympia, and the Temple of Asclepius, Epidaurus, had much of the naos floor occupied by a very shallow pool filled with water (Parthenon) or olive oil at Olympia. All these had chryselephantine images, and Pausanias was perhaps correct to link the Parthenon one with the maintenance of the proper humidity, but they probably increased the light, and perhaps gave it attractive effects of reflections.

==== Access ====
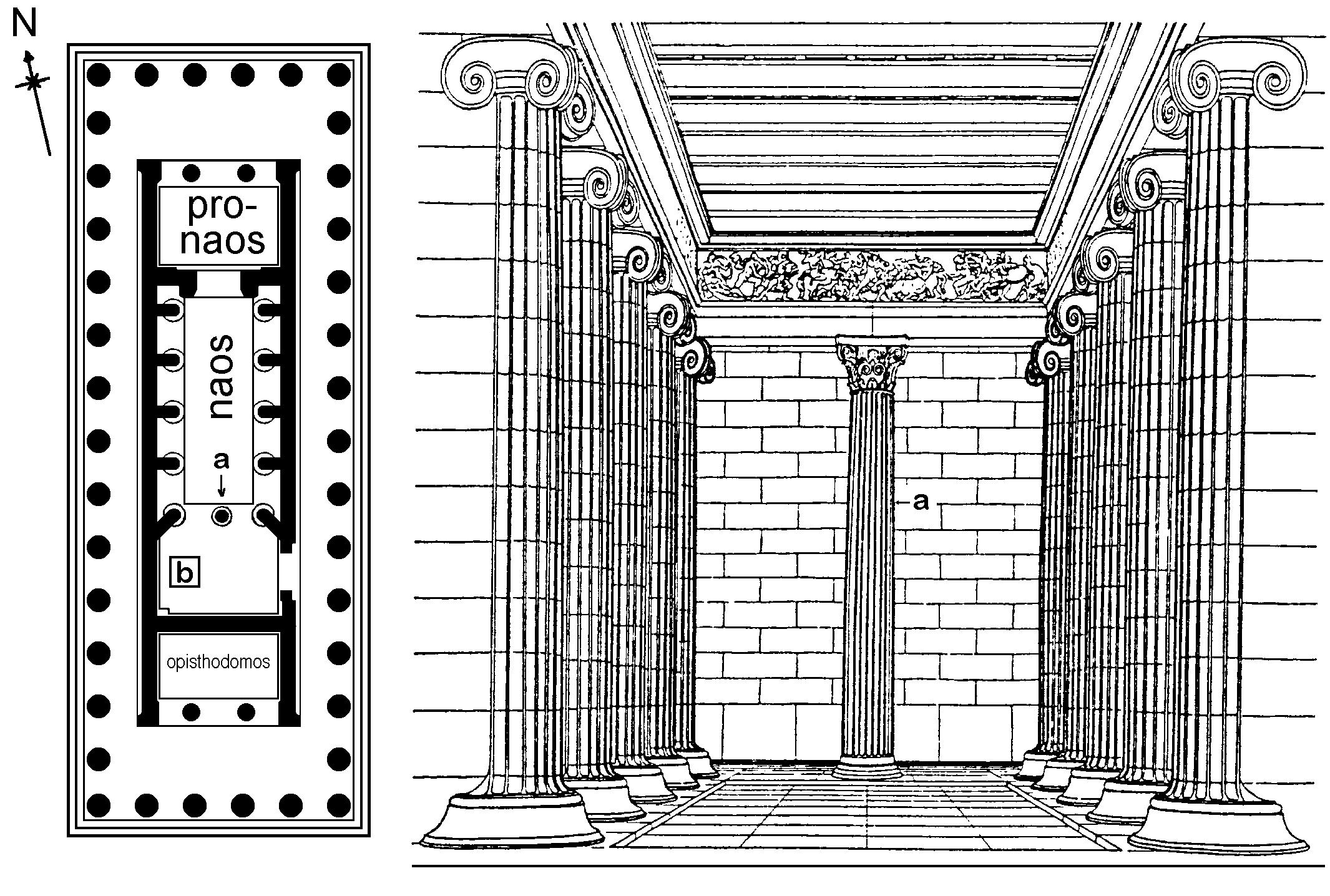
Plan and interior reconstruction of the Temple of Apollo Epikourios at Bassae. Note the side entrance to the naos and the single Corinthian column.

It used to be thought that access to the naos of a Greek temple was limited to the priests, and it was entered only rarely by other visitors, except perhaps during important festivals or other special occasions. In recent decades this picture has changed, and scholars now stress the variety of local access rules. Pausanias was a gentlemanly traveller of the 2nd-century AD who declares that the special intention of his travels around Greece was to see cult images, which he usually managed to do.

It was typically necessary to make a sacrifice or gift, and some temples restricted access either to certain days of the year, or by class, race, gender (with either men or women forbidden), or even more tightly. Garlic-eaters were forbidden in one temple, in another women unless they were virgins; restrictions typically arose from local ideas of ritual purity or a perceived whim of the deity. In some places visitors were asked to show they spoke Greek; elsewhere Dorians were not allowed entry. Some temples could only be viewed from the threshold. Some temples are said never to be opened at all. But generally Greeks, including slaves, had a reasonable expectation of being allowed into the naos. Once inside the naos it was possible to pray to or before the cult image, and sometimes to touch it; Cicero saw a bronze image of Heracles with its foot largely worn away by the touch of devotees. Famous cult images such as the Statue of Zeus at Olympia functioned as significant visitor attractions.

Sometimes, the divine character of the cult image was stressed even more by removing it further into a separate space within the naos, the adyton. Especially in Magna Graecia, this tradition continued for a long time. Over the decades and centuries, numerous votive offerings could be placed in the naos, giving it a museum-like character (Pausanias 5, 17).

=== Opisthodomos ===
The back room of the temple, the opisthodomos, usually served as a storage space for cult equipment. It could also hold the temple treasury. For some time, the opisthodomos of the Athenian Parthenon contained the treasury of the Delian League, thus directly protected by the deity. Pronaoi and opisthodomoi were often closed off from the peristasis by wooden barriers or fences.

=== Peristasis ===
Like the naos, the peristasis could serve the display and storage of votives, often placed between the columns. In some cases, votive offerings could also be directly affixed to the columns, as is visible e.g. on the Temple of Hera at Olympia. The peristasis could also be used for cult processions, or simply as shelter from the elements, a function emphasised by Vitruvius (III 3, 8f).

== Sponsors, construction and costs ==
=== Public and private sponsors ===
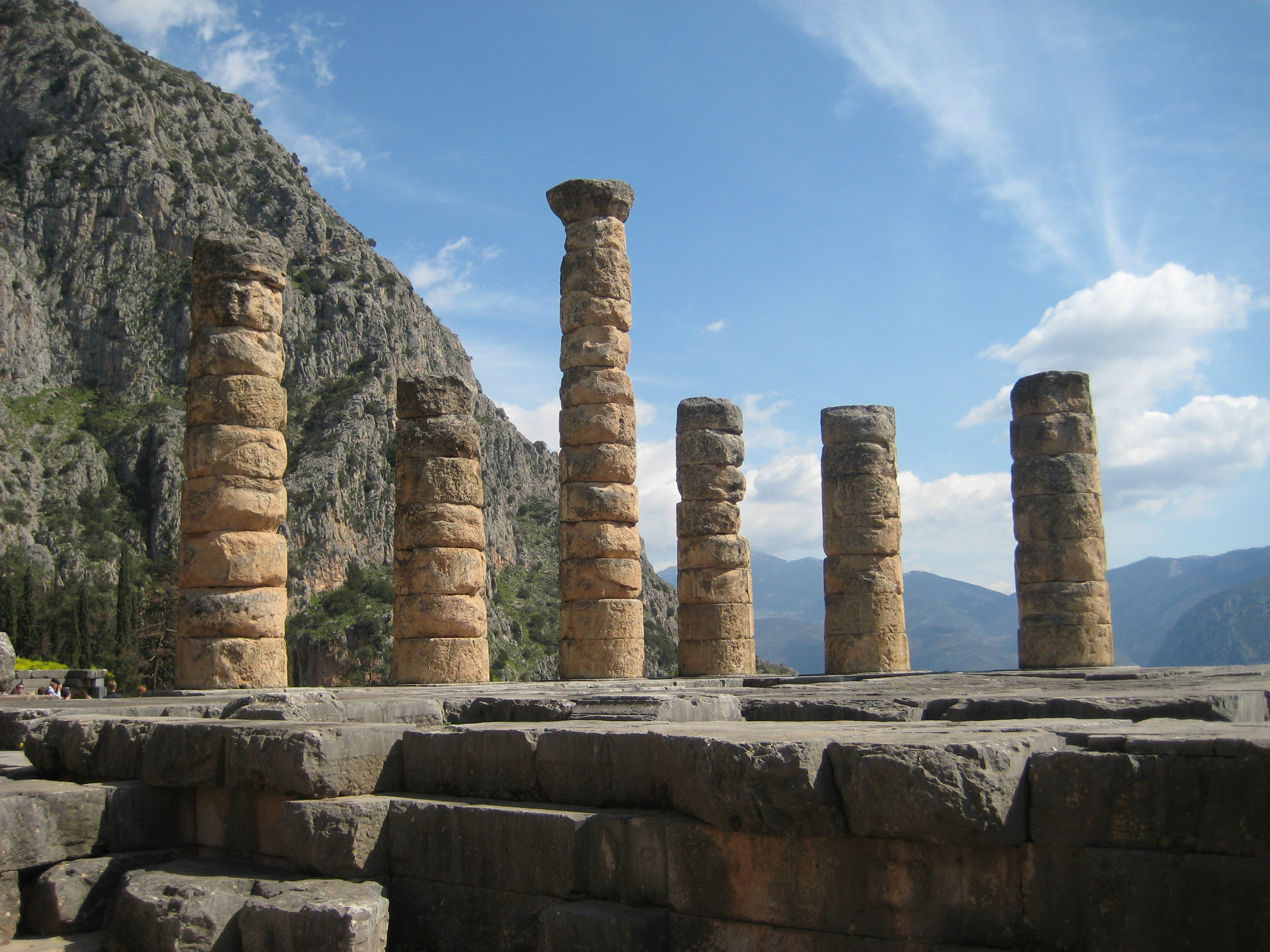
In the late 6th century, the Alcmaeonidae family strongly supported the rebuilding of the Temple of Apollo at Delphi, so as to improve their standing in Athens and Greece.

The sponsors of Greek temples usually belonged to one of two groups: on the one hand public sponsors, including the bodies and institutions that administrated important sanctuaries; on the other hand influential and affluent private sponsors, especially Hellenistic kings. The financial needs were covered by income from taxes or special levies, or by the sale of raw materials like silver. The collection of donations also occurred, especially for supra-regional sanctuaries like Delphi or Olympia. Hellenistic monarchs could appear as private donors in cities outside their immediate sphere of influence and sponsor public buildings, as exemplified by Antiochos IV, who ordered the rebuilding of the Olympieion at Athens. In such cases, the money came from the private treasury of the donor.

=== Organization ===
Building contracts were advertised after a popular or elected assembly had passed the relevant motion. An appointed committee would choose the winner among the submitted plans. Afterwards, another committee would supervise the building process. Its responsibilities included the advertising and awarding of individual contracts, the practical supervision of the construction, the inspection and acceptance of completed parts, and the paying of wages. The original advert contained all the information necessary to enable a contractor to make a realistic offer for completing the task. Contracts were normally awarded to the competitor offering the most complete service for the cheapest price. In the case of public buildings, the materials were normally provided by the public sponsor, exceptions were clarified in the contract. Contractors were usually only responsible for specific parts of the overall construction, as most businesses were small. Originally, payment was by person and day, but from the 5th century onward, payment by piece or construction stage became common.

=== Costs ===
The costs could be immense. For example, surviving receipts show that in the rebuilding of the Artemision of Ephesos, a single column cost 40,000 drachmas. Considering that a worker was paid about two drachmas, that equals nearly two million euro (at a modern western European wage scale). Since the overall number of columns required for the design was 120, even this aspect of the building would have caused costs equivalent to those of major projects today (circa 360 million euro).

== Temples of the different architectural orders ==
One of the criteria by which Greek temples are classified is the Classical order chosen as their basic aesthetic principle. This choice, which was rarely entirely free, but normally determined by tradition and local habit, would lead to widely differing rules of design. According to the three major orders, a basic distinction can be made between the Doric, the Ionic and the Corinthian temple.

=== Doric temples ===
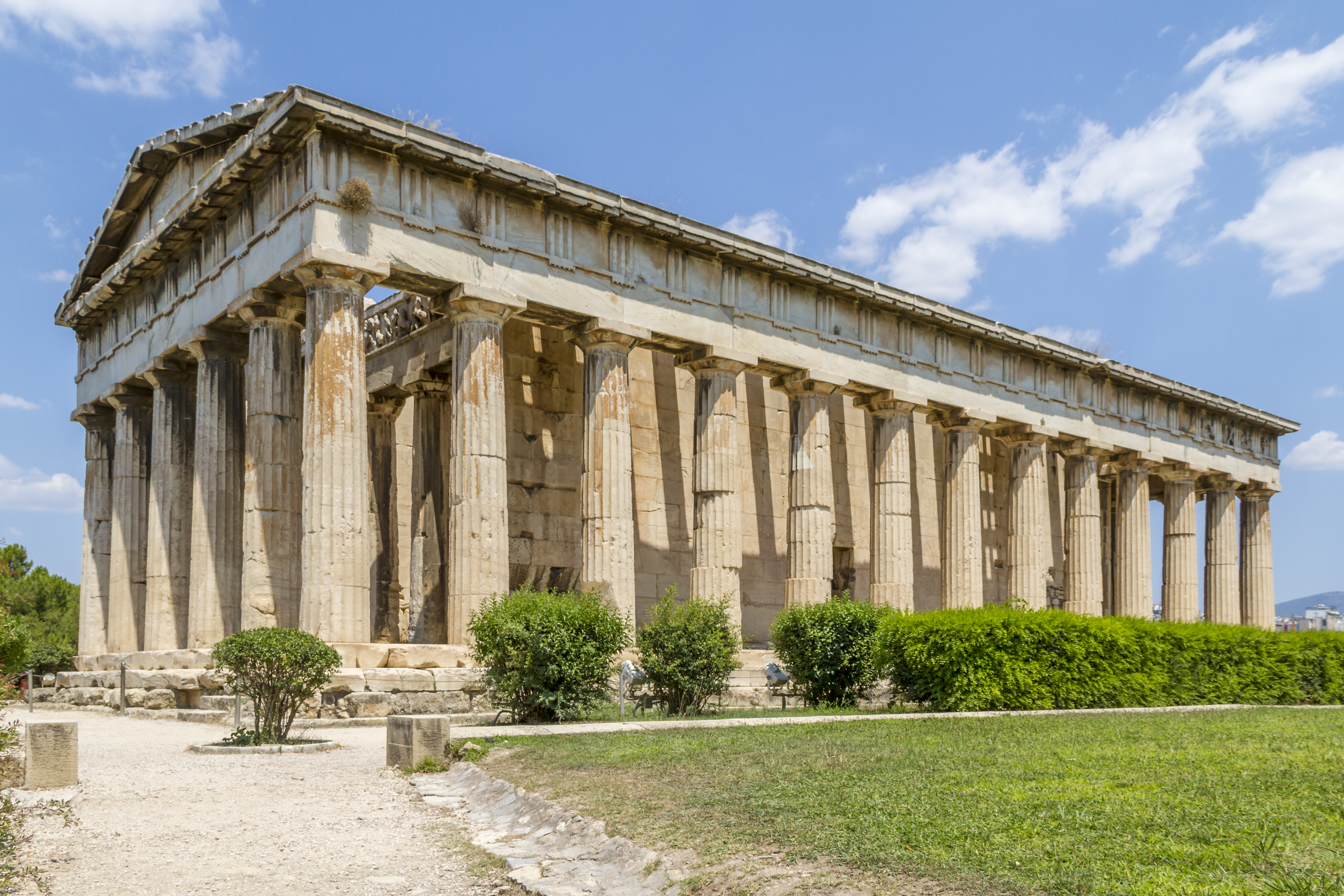
The Temple of Hephaistos in Athens, the best-preserved Doric temple in Greece.

The modern image of Greek temple architecture is strongly influenced by the numerous reasonably well-preserved temples of the Doric order. Especially the ruins of Southern Italy and Sicily were accessible to western travellers quite early in the development of Classical studies, e.g. the temples at Paestum, Akragas or Segesta, but the Hephaisteion and the Parthenon of Athens also influenced scholarship and Neoclassical architecture from an early point onward.

==== Beginnings ====
The beginnings of Greek temple construction in the Doric order can be traced to early in the 7th century BC. With the transition to stone architecture around 600, the order was fully developed; from then on, only details were changed, developed and refined, mostly in the context of solving the challenges posed by the design and construction of monumental temples.

==== First monumental temples ====
Apart from early forms, occasionally still with apsidal backs and hipped roofs, the first 100-foot (30 m) peripteral temples occur quite soon, before 600. An example is Temple C at Thermos, c. 625, a 100-foot-long (30 m) hekatompedos, surrounded by a peristasis of 5 × 15 columns, its naos divided in two aisles by a central row of columns. Its entirely Doric entablature is indicated by painted clay plaques, probably early example of metopes, and clay triglyphs. It appears to be the case that all temples erected within the spheres of influence of Corinth and Argos in the 7th century were Doric peripteroi. The earliest stone columns did not display the simple squatness of the high and late Archaic specimens, but rather mirror the slenderness of their wooden predecessors. Already around 600, the demand of viewability from all sides was applied to the Doric temple, leading to the mirroring of the frontal pronaos by an opisthodomos at the back. This early demand continued to affect Doric temples especially in the Greek motherland. Neither the Ionic temples, nor the Doric specimens in Magna Graecia followed this principle. The increasing monumentalisation of stone buildings, and the transfer of the wooden roof construction to the level of the geison removed the fixed relationship between the naos and the peristasis. This relationship between the axes of walls and columns, almost a matter of course in smaller structures, remained undefined and without fixed rules for nearly a century: the position of the naos "floated" within the peristasis.

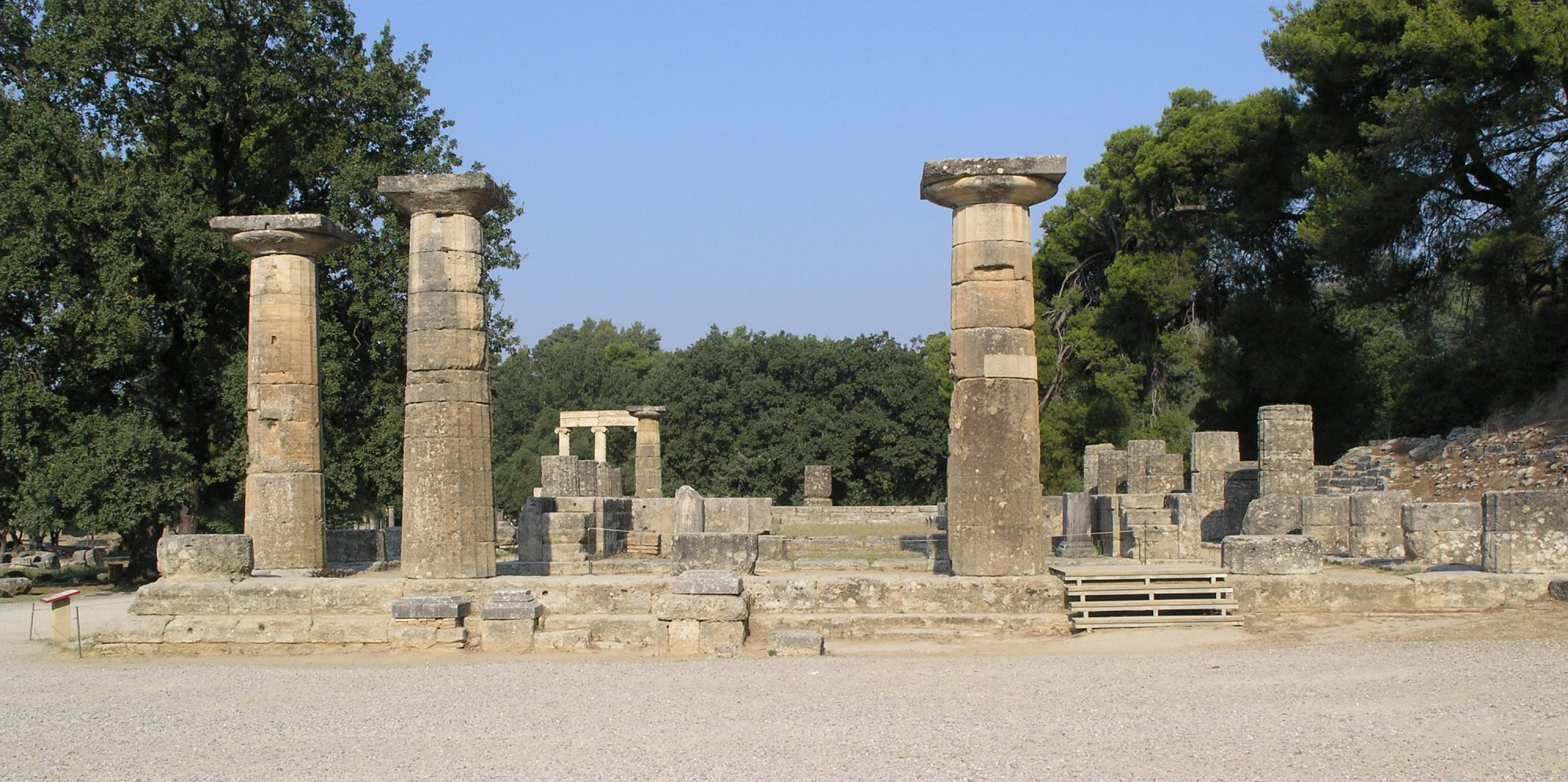
The Doric columns of the Heraion of Olympia

==== Stone-built temples ====
===== The Heraion at Olympia (c. 600 BC) =====
The Heraion of Olympia (c. 600 BC) exemplifies the transition from wood to stone construction. This building, initially constructed entirely of wood and mudbrick, had its wooden columns gradually replaced with stone ones over time. Like a museum of Doric columns and Doric capitals, it contains examples of all chronological phases, up to the Roman period. One of the columns in the opisthodomos remained wooden at least until the 2nd century AD, when Pausanias described it. This 6 × 16-column temple already called for a solution to the Doric corner conflict. It was achieved through a reduction of the corner intercolumniations the so-called corner contraction. The Heraion is most advanced in regards to the relationship between naos and peristasis, as it uses the solution that became canonical decades later, a linear axis running along the external faces of the outer naos walls and through the central axis of the associated columns. Its differentiation between wider intercolumnia on the narrow sides and narrower ones on the long sides was also an influential feature, as was the positioning of the columns within the naos, corresponding with those on the outside, a feature not repeated until the construction of the temple at Bassae 150 years later.

===== Temple of Artemis, Kerkyra (early 6th century BC) =====
The oldest Doric temple entirely built of stone is represented by the early 6th century BC Artemis Temple in Kerkyra (modern Corfu). All parts of this building are bulky and heavy, its columns reach a height of barely five times their bottom diameter and were very closely spaced with an intercolumniation of a single column width. The individual members of its Doric orders all differ considerably from the later canon, although all essential Doric features are present. Its ground plan of 8 by 17 columns, probably pseudoperipteral, is unusual.

===== Archaic Olympieion, Athens =====
Among the Doric temples, the Peisistratid Olympieion at Athens has a special position. Although this building was never completed, its architect apparently attempted to adapt the Ionic dipteros. Column drums built into the later foundations indicate that it was originally planned as a Doric temple. Nonetheless, its ground plan follows the Ionic examples of Samos so closely that it would be hard to reconcile such a solution with a Doric triglyph frieze. After the expulsion of Hippias in 510, work on this structure was stopped: Democratic Athens had no desire to continue a monument of tyrannical self-aggrandisation.

==== Classical period: canonisation ====
Apart from this exception and some examples in the more experimental poleis of Greater Greece, the Classical Doric temple type remained the peripteros. Its perfection was a priority of artistic endeavour throughout the Classical period.

===== Temple of Zeus, Olympia (460) =====
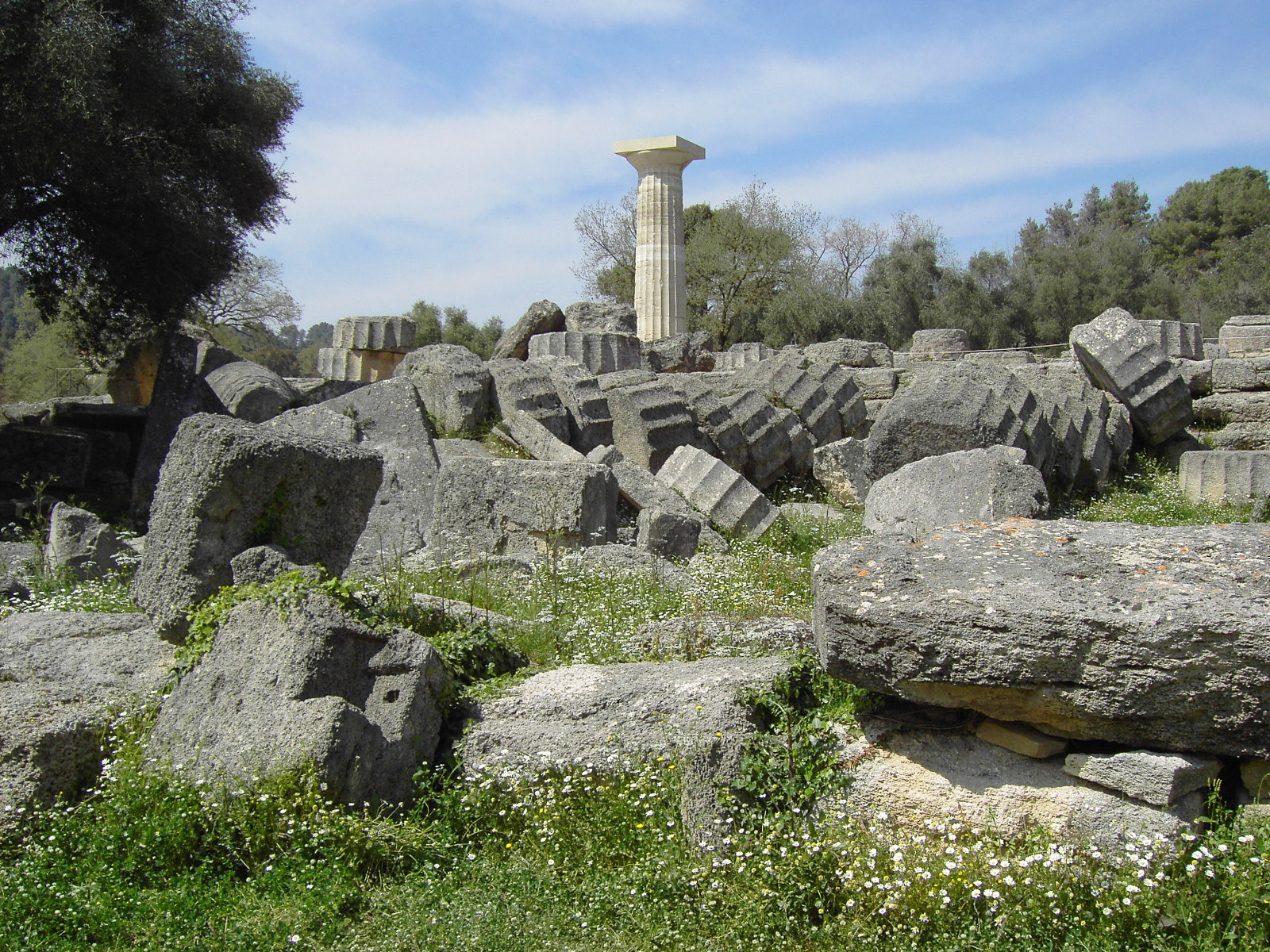
Ruin of the Temple of Zeus at Olympia.

The canonical solution was found fairly soon by the architect Libon of Elis, who erected the Temple of Zeus at Olympia around 46. With its 6 × 13 columns or 5 × 12 intercolumniations, this temple was designed entirely rationally. Its column bays (axis to axis) measured 16 feet (4.9 m), a triglyph + metope 8 feet (2.4 m), a mutulus plus the adjacent space (via) 4 feet (1.2 m), the tile width of the marble roof was 2 feet (0.61 m). Its columns are powerful, with only a slight entasis; the echinus of the capitals is already nearly linear at 45°. All of the superstructure is affected by curvature. The naos measures exactly 3 × 9 column distances (axis to axis), its external wall faces are aligned with the axes of the adjacent columns.

===== Other canonical Classical temples =====
The Classical proportion, 6 × 13 columns, is taken up by numerous temples, e.g. the Temple of Apollo on Delos (c. 470), the Temple of Hephaistos at Athens and the temple of Poseidon on Cape Sounion. A slight variation, with 6 × 12 columns or 5 × 11 intercolumniations occurs as frequently.

===== The Parthenon (450) =====
Plan of the Parthenon, note triple colonnade in the naos and pillared room at back.

The Parthenon maintains the same proportion at a larger scale of 8 × 17 columns, but follows the same principles. In spite of the eight columns on its front, the temple is a pure peripteros, its external naos walls align with the axes of the second and seventh columns. In other regards, the Parthenon is distinguished as an exceptional example among the mass of Greek peripteroi by many distinctive aesthetic solutions in detail.

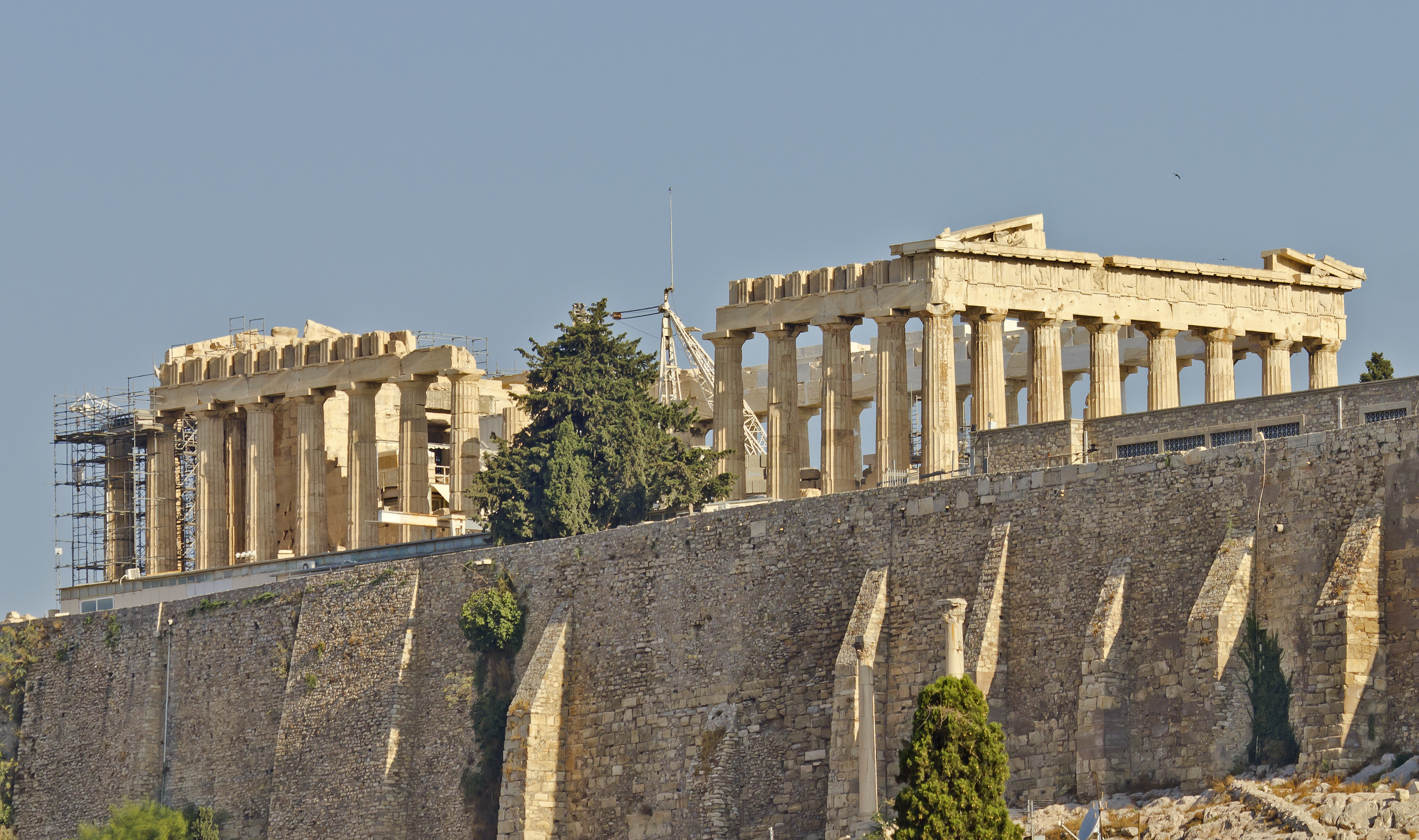
The Parthenon.

For example, the antae of pronaos and opisthodomos are shortened so as to form simple pillars. Instead of longer antae, there are prostyle colonnades inside the peristasis on the front and back, reflecting Ionic habits. The execution of the naos, with a western room containing four columns, is also exceptional. The Parthenon's Archaic predecessor already contained such a room. All measurements in the Parthenon are determined by the proportion 4:9. It determines column width to column distance, width to length of the stylobate, and of the naos without antae. The temple's width to height up to the geison is determined by the reverse proportion 9:4, the same proportion squared, 81:16, determines temple length to height. All of this mathematical rigour is relaxed and loosened by the optical refinements mentioned above, which affect the whole building, from layer to layer, and element to element. 92 sculpted metopes decorate its triglyph frieze: centauromachy, amazonomachy and gigantomachy are its themes. The external walls of the naos are crowned with a figural frieze surrounding the entire naos and depicting the Panathenaic procession as well as the Assembly of the Gods. Large format figures decorate the pediments on the narrow sides. This conjunction of strict principles and elaborate refinements makes the Parthenon the paradigmatic Classical temple. The Temple of Hephaistos at Athens, erected shortly after the Parthenon, uses the same aesthetic and proportional principles, without adhering as closely to the 4:9 proportion.

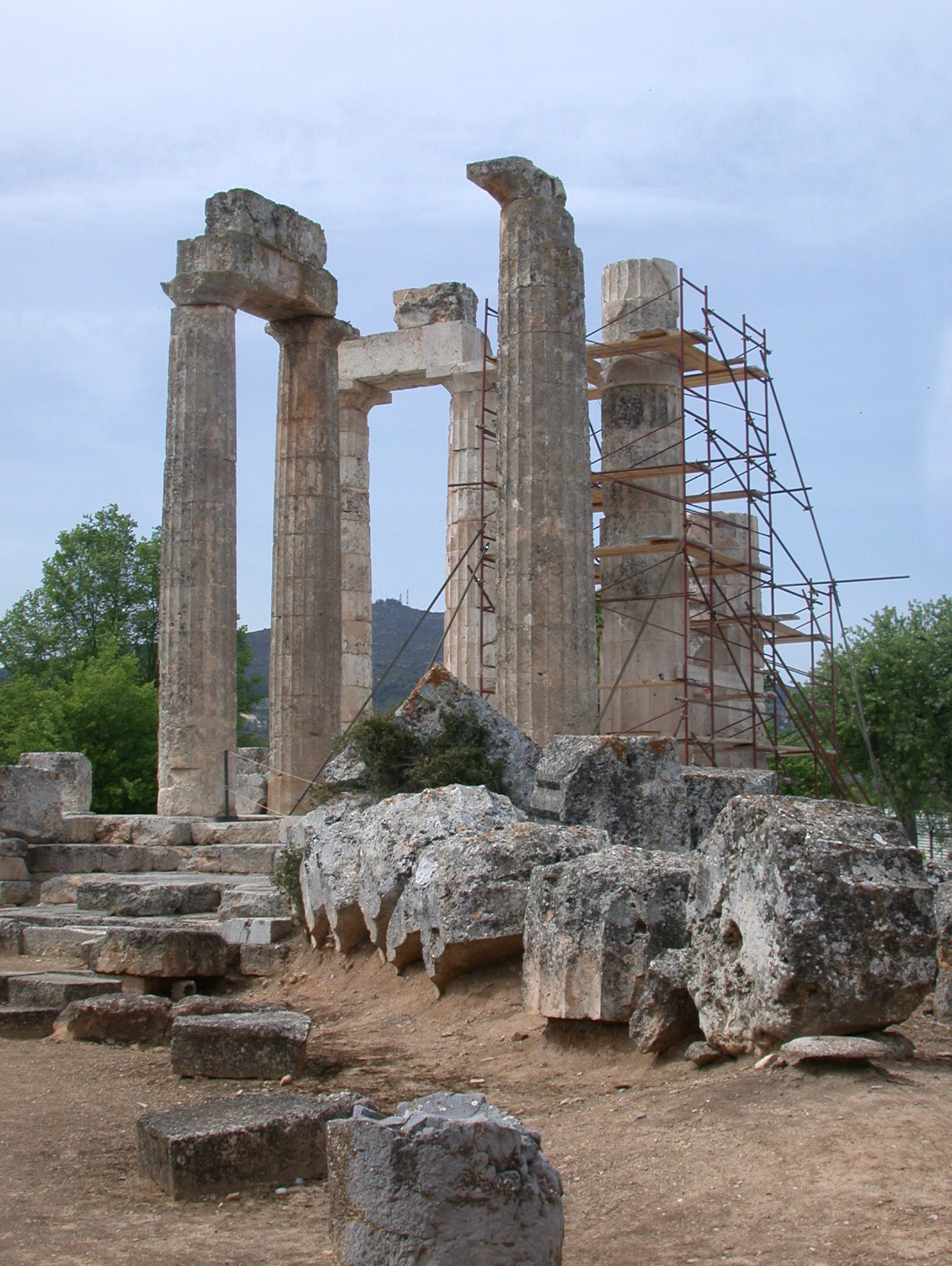
The temple of Zeus at Nemea.

==== Late Classical and Hellenistic: changing proportions ====
In the 4th century BC, a few Doric temples were erected with 6 × 15 or 6 × 14 columns, probably referring to local Archaic predecessors, e.g. the Temple of Zeus in Nemea and that of Athena in Tegea. Generally, Doric temples followed a tendency to become lighter in their superstructures. Columns became narrower, intercolumniations wider. This shows a growing adjustment to the proportion and weight of Ionic temples, mirrored by a progressive tendency among Ionic temples to become somewhat heavier. In the light of this mutual influence it is not surprising that in the late 4th century BC temple of Zeus at Nemea, the front is emphasised by a pronaos two intercolumniations deep, while the opisthodomos is suppressed. Frontality is a key feature of Ionic temples. The emphasis on the pronaos already occurred in the slightly older temple of Athena at Tegea, but there it was repeated in the opisthodomos. Both temples continued the tendency towards more richly equipped interiors, in both cases with engaged or full columns of the Corinthian order.

The increasing reduction of the number of columns along the long sides, clearly visible on Ionic temples, is mirrored in Doric constructions. A small temple at Kournó has a peristasis of merely 6 × 7 columns, a stylobate of only 8 × 10 m and corners executed as pilasters towards the front. The peristasis of monumental Doric temples is merely hinted at here; the function as a simple canopy for the shrine of the cult statue is clear.

==== Doric temples in Magna Graecia ====
Sicily and Southern Italy hardly participated in these developments. Here, most temple construction took place during the 6th and 5th centuries BC. Later, the Western Greeks showed a pronounced tendency to develop unusual architectural solutions, more or less unthinkable in the mother poleis of their colonies. For example, there are two examples of temples with uneven column numbers at the front, Temple of Hera I at Paestum and Temple of Apollo A at Metapontum. Both temples had fronts of nine columns.

The technical possibilities of the western Greeks, which had progressed beyond those in the motherland, permitted many deviations. For example, innovations regarding the construction of the entablature developed in the west allowed the spanning of much wider spaces than before, leading to some very deep peristaseis and broad naoi. The peristasis often had a depth of two column distances, e.g. at Temple of Hera I, Paestum, and temples C, F and G at Selinus, classifying them as pseudodipteroi. The opisthodomos only played a subsidiary role, but did occur sometimes, e.g. at the temple of Poseidon in Paestum. Much more frequently, the temples included a separate room at the back end of the naos, entrance to which was usually forbidden, the adyton. In some cases, the adyton was a free-standing structure within the naos, e.g. temple G in Selinus. If possible, columns inside the naos were avoided, allowing for open roof constructions of up to 13 m width.

The largest such structure was the Olympieion of Akragas, an 8 × 17 columns peripteros, but in many regards an absolutely "un-Greek" structure, equipped with details such as engaged, figural pillars (Telamons), and a peristasis partially closed off by walls. With external dimensions of 56 × 113 m, it was the largest Doric building ever to be completed. If the colonies showed remarkable independence and will to experiment in basic terms, they did so even more in terms of detail. For example, the lower surfaces of Doric geisa could be decorated with coffers instead of mutuli.

Although a strong tendency to emphasize the front, e.g. through the addition of ramps or stairs with up to eight steps (at Temple C in Selinus), or a pronaos depth of 3.5 column distances (temple of Apollo at Syracuse) had become a key principle of design, this was relativised by the broadening of column distances on the long sides, e.g. Temple of Hera I at Paestum. Only in the colonies could the Doric corner conflict be ignored. If South Italian architects tried to solve it, they used a variety of solutions: broadening of the corner metopes or triglyphs, variation of column distance or metopes. In some cases, different solutions were used on the broad and narrow sides of the same building.

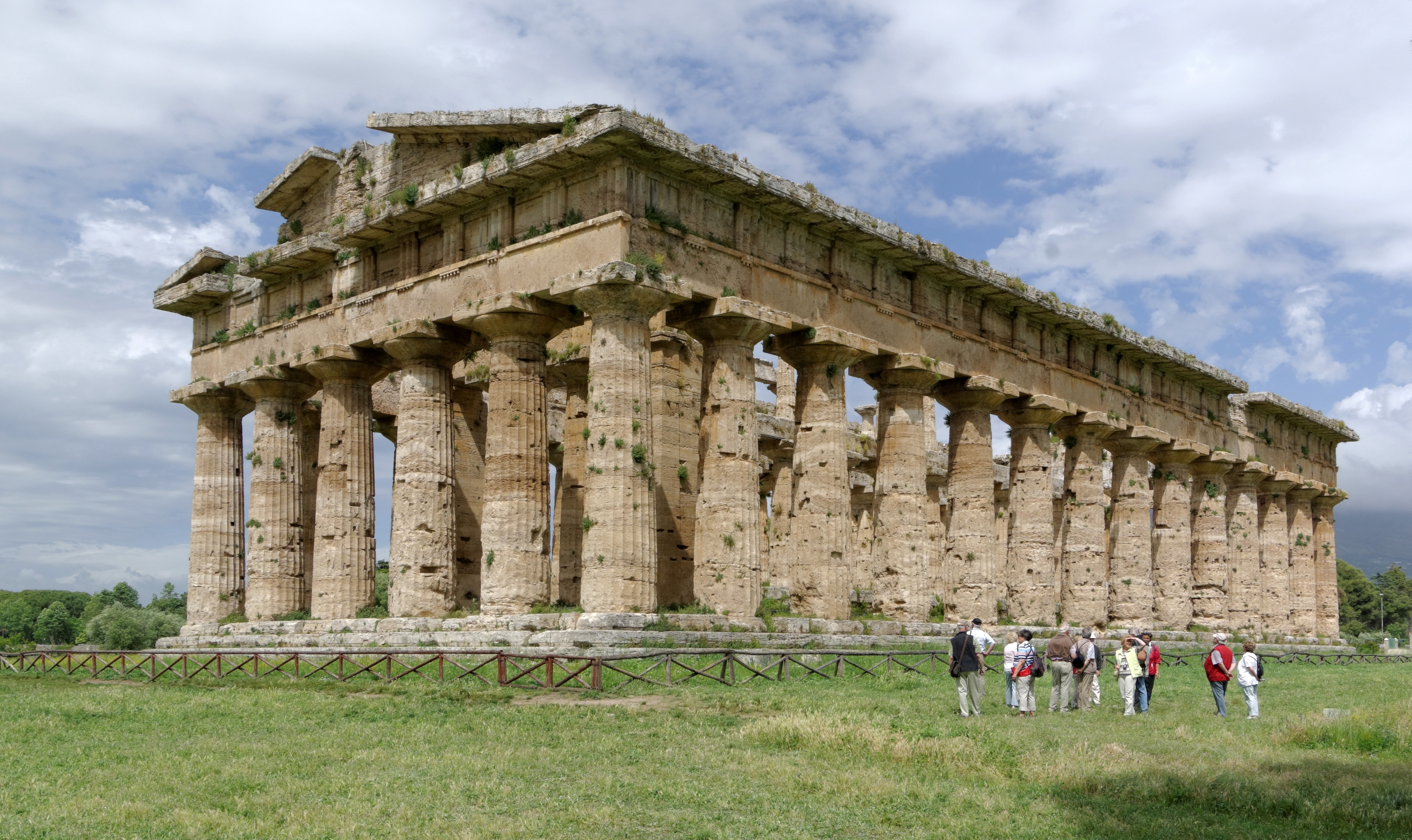
Temple of Hera II at Paestum.

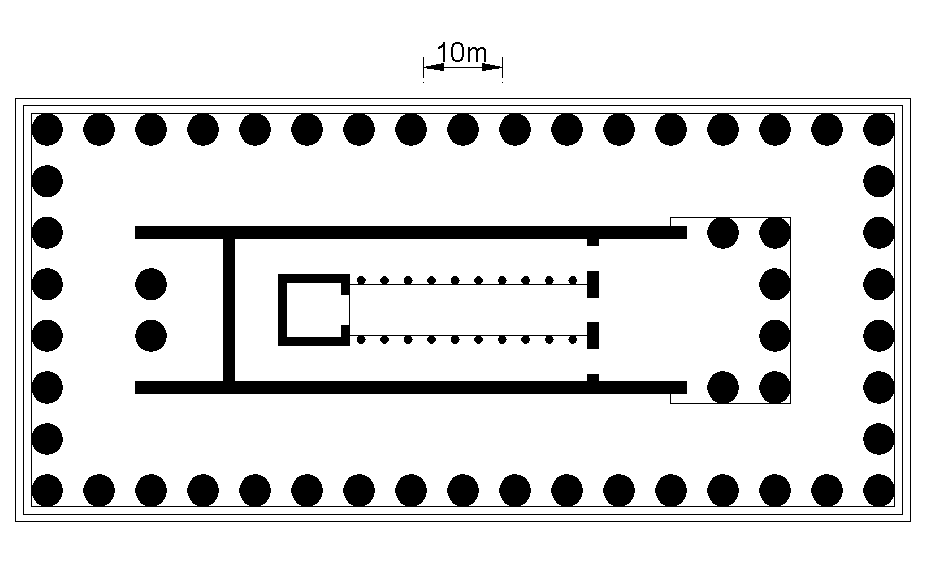
Temple G, Selinus, with well-defined adyton.

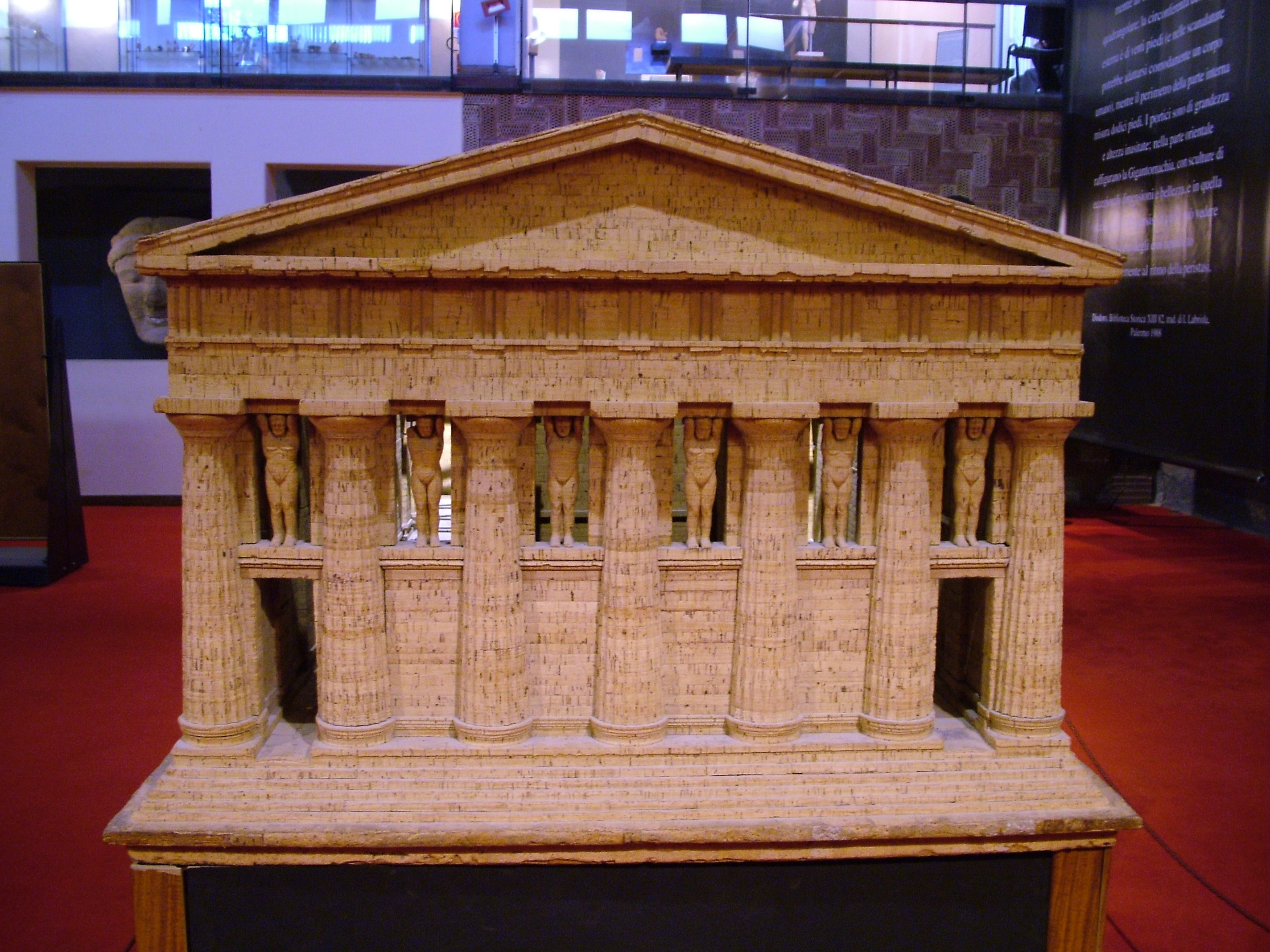
Model of the Olympieion at Akragas.

=== Ionic temples ===
Typical proportions of the Ionic order.

==== Origins ====
For the early period, before the 6th century, the term Ionic temple can, at best, designate a temple in the Ionian areas of settlement. No fragments of architecture belonging to the Ionic order have been found from this time. Nonetheless, some early temples in the area already indicate the rational system that was to characterise the Ionic system later on, e.g. the Heraion II on Samos. Thus, even at an early point, the axes of the naos walls aligned with the column axes, whereas in Doric architecture, the external wall faces do so. The early temples also show no concern for the typical Doric feature of visibility from all sides, they regularly lack an opisthodomos; the peripteros only became widespread in the area in the 4th century. In contrast, from an early point, Ionic temples stress the front by using double porticos. Elongated peristaseis became a determining element. At the same time, the Ionic temples were characterised by their tendency to use varied and richly decorated surfaces, as well as the widespread use of light-shade contrasts.

==== Monumental Ionic temples ====
===== The Heraion of Samos =====
As soon as the Ionic order becomes recognisable in temple architecture, it is increased to monumental sizes. The temple in the Heraion of Samos, erected by Rhoikos around 560, is the first known dipteros, with outside dimensions of 52 × 105 m. A double portico of 8 × 21 columns enclosed the naos, the back even had ten columns. The front used differing column distances, with a wider central opening. In proportion to the bottom diameter, the columns reached three times the height of a Doric counterpart. 40 flutings enriched the complex surface structure of the column shafts. Samian column bases were decorated with a sequence of horizontal flutings, but in spite of this playfulness they weighed 1,500 kg a piece. The capitals of this structure were probably still entirely of wood, as was the entablature. Ionic volute capitals survive from the outer peristasis of the later rebuilding by Polycrates. The columns of the inner peristasis had leaf decoration and no volutes.

===== Cycladic Ionic =====
In the Cyclades, there were early temples entirely built of marble. Volute capitals have not been found associated with these, but their marble entablatures belonged to the Ionic order.

===== The Artemision of Ephesos =====
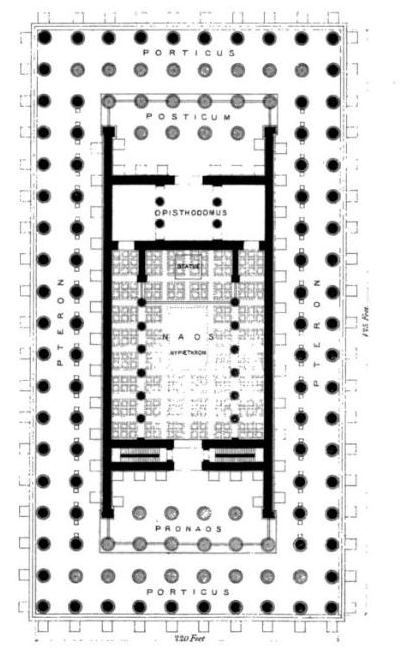
Plan of the Artemision at Ephesos.

Roughly beginning with the erection of the older Artemision of Ephesos around 550, the quantity of archaeological remains of Ionic temples increases. The Artemision was planned as a dipteros, its architect Theodoros had been one of the builders of the Samian Heraion. With a substructure of 55 × 115 m, the Artemision outscaled all precedents. Its naos was executed as unroofed internal peristyle courtyard, the so-called sekos. The building was entirely of marble. The temple was considered as one of the seven wonders of the ancient world, which may be justified, considering the efforts involved in its construction.

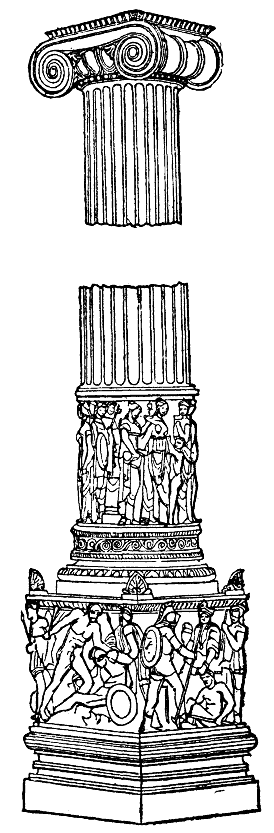
Columna caelata from the Artemision.

The columns stood on ephesian bases, 36 of them were decorated with life-sized friezes of human figures at the bottom of the shaft, the so-called columnae caelatae. The columns had between 40 and 48 flutings, some of them cut to alternate between a wider and a narrower fluting. The oldest marble architraves of Greek architecture, found at the Artemision, also spanned the widest distances ever achieved in pure stone. The middle architrave block was 8.74 m long and weighed 24 metric tons; it had to be lifted to its final position, 20 m above ground, with a system of pulleys. Like its precedents, the temple used differentiated column widths in the front, and had a higher number of columns at the back. According to ancient sources, Kroisos was one of the sponsors. An inscription referring to his sponsorship was indeed found on one of the columns. The temple was burnt down by Herostratos in 356 BC and reerected soon thereafter. For the replacement, a crepidoma of ten or more steps was erected. Older Ionic temples normally lacked a specific visible substructure. This emphasised basis had to be balanced out be a heightened entablature, producing not only a visual contrast to, but also a major weight upon the slender columns.

===== Temple of Apollo at Didyma =====
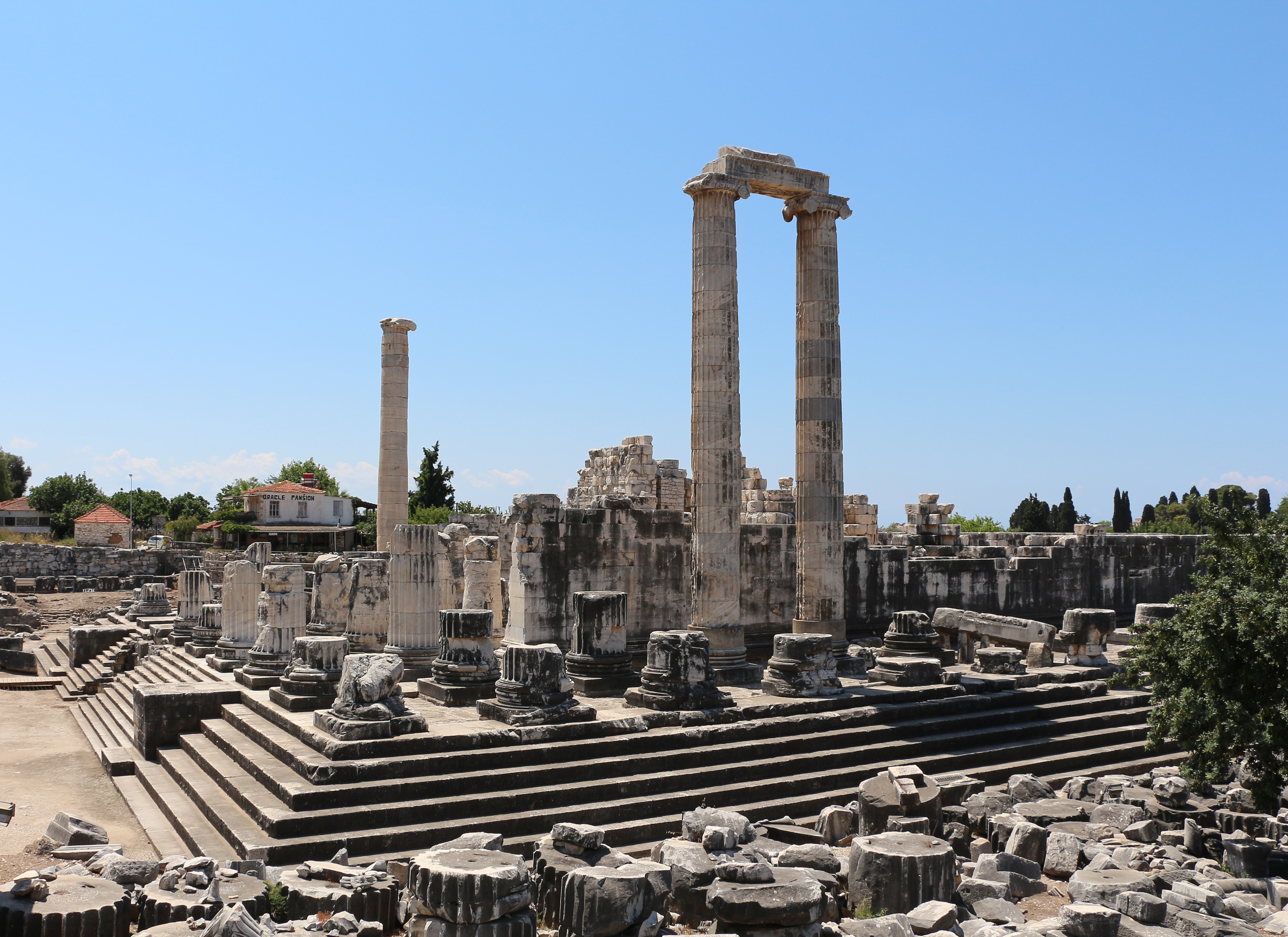
Remains of the temple of Apollo at Didyma.

The temple of Apollo at Didyma near Miletus, begun around 540, was another dipteros with open internal courtyard. The interior was structured with powerful pilasters, their rhythm reflecting that of the external peristasis. The columns, with 36 flutings, were executed as columnae caelatae with figural decoration, like those at Ephesos. Construction ceased around 500, but was restarted in 331 and finally completed in the 2nd century. The enormous costs involved may have been one of the reasons for the long period of construction. The building was the first Ionic temple to follow the Attic tradition of uniform column distances, the frontal differentiation was not practised any more.

===== Temple of Athena Polias, Priene =====
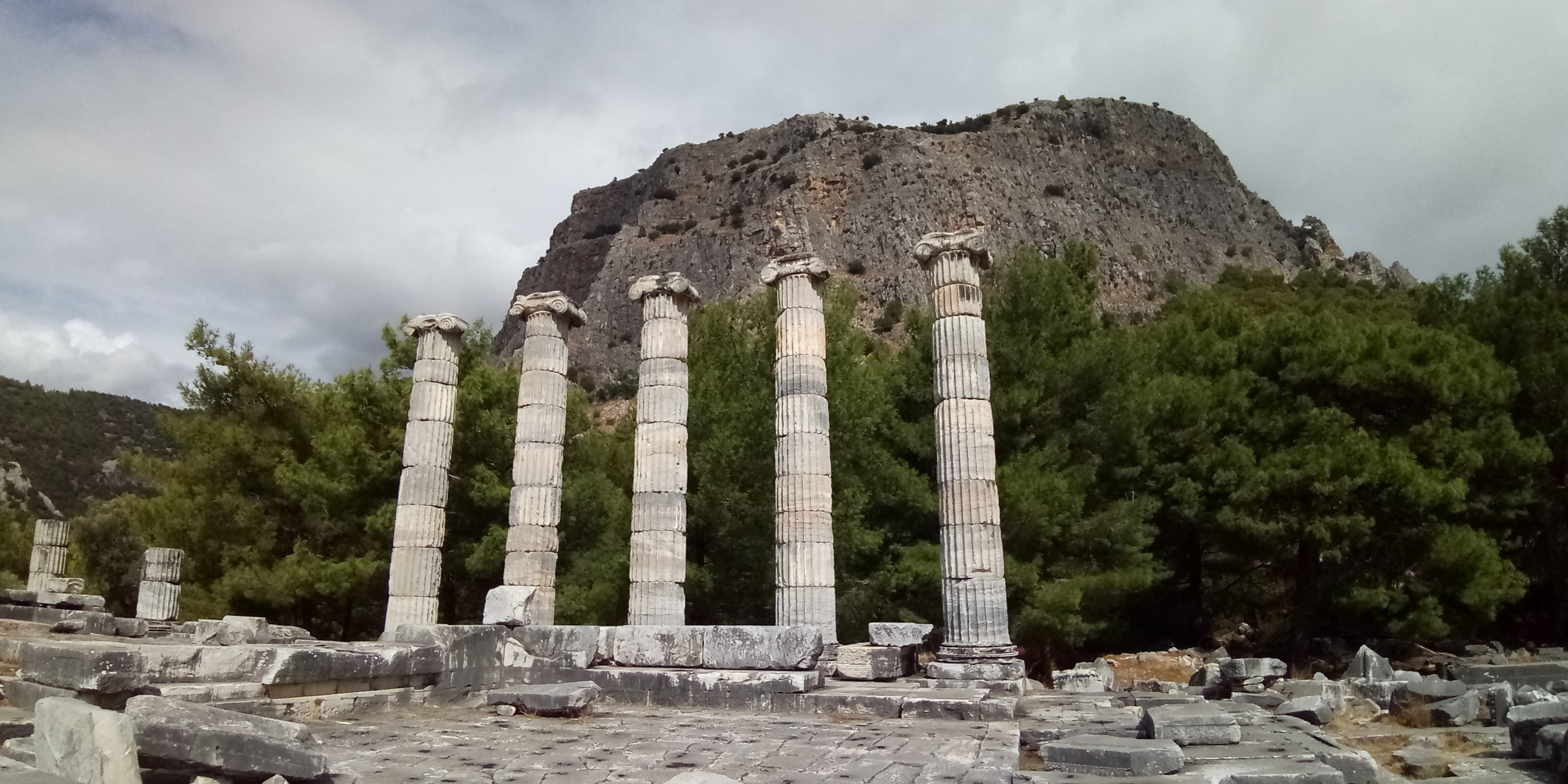
Ruins of the temple of Athena at Priene

Ionic peripteroi were usually somewhat smaller and shorter in their dimensions than Doric ones. E.g., the temple of Zeus at Labraunda had only 6 × 8 columns, the temple of Aphrodite in Samothrace only 6 × 9. The temple of Athena Polias at Priene, already considered in antiquity as the classical example of an Ionic temple, has partially survived. It was the first monumental peripteros of Ionia, erected between 350 and 330 by Pytheos. It is based on a 6-by-6-foot (1.8 m × 1.8 m) grid (the exact dimensions of its plinths). The temple had 6 × 11 columns, i.e. a proportion of 5:10 or 1:2 intercolumnia. Walls and columns were aligned axially, according to Ionic tradition. The peristasis was of equal depth on all sides, eliminating the usual emphasis on the front, an opisthodomos, integrated into the back of the naos, is the first proper example in Ionic architecture. The evident rational-mathematical aspect to the design suits Ionic Greek culture, with its strong tradition of natural philosophy. Pytheos was to be of major influence far beyond his lifetime. Hermogenes, who probably came from Priene, was a deserving successor and achieved the final flourish of Ionic architecture around 200 BC.

===== The Artemision of Magnesia =====
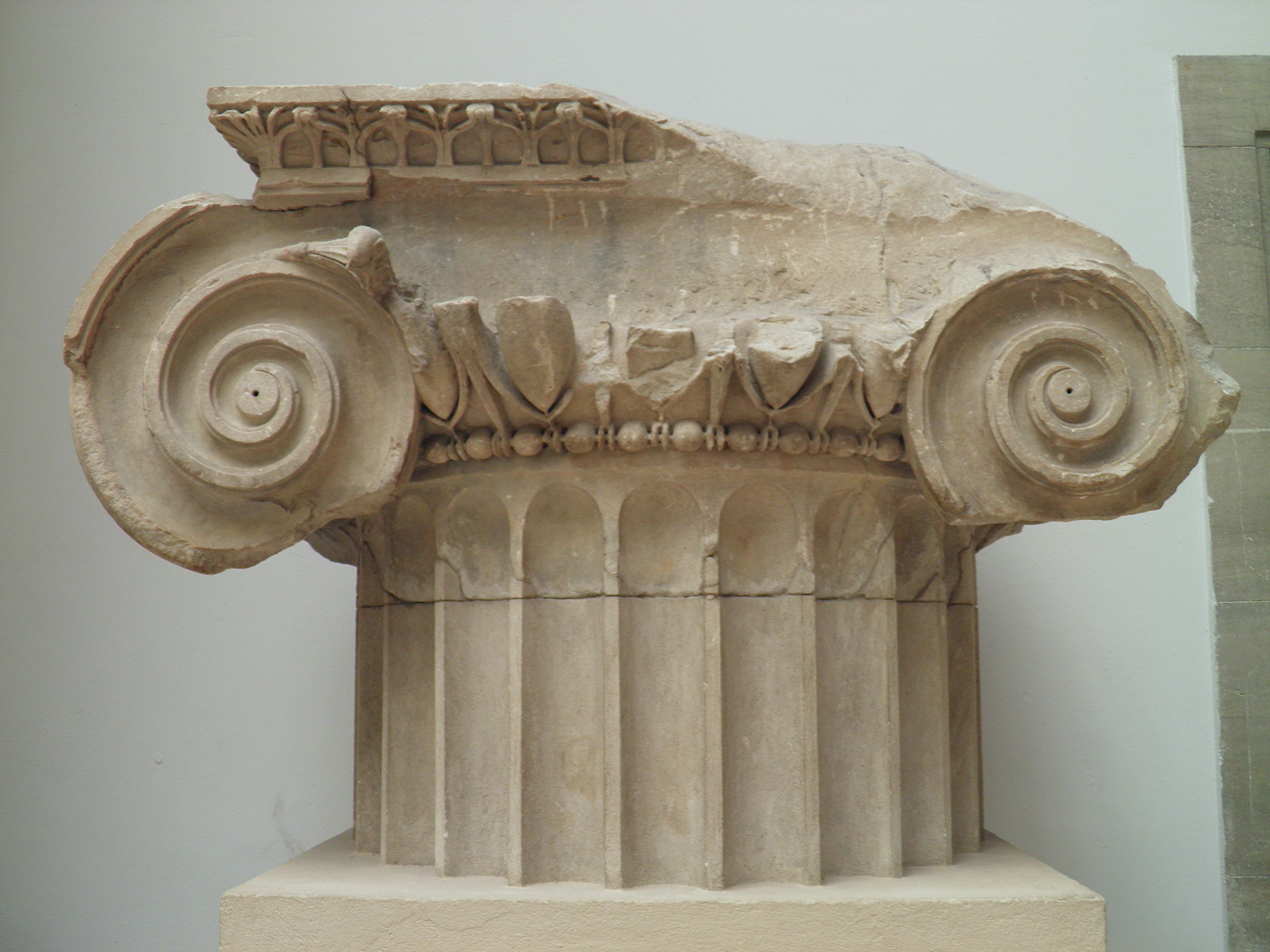
Capital from the Artemision of Magnesia on the Maeander (Berlin, Pergamonmuseum).

One of the projects led by Hermogenes was the Artemision of Magnesia on the Maeander, one of the first pseudodipteroi. other early pseudodipteroi include the temple of Aphrodite at Messa on Lesbos, belonging to the age of Hermogenes or earlier, the temple of Apollo Sminthaios on Chryse and the temple of Apollo at Alabanda. The arrangement of the pseudodipteros, omitting the interior row of columns while maintaining a peristasis with the width of two column distances, produces a massively broadened portico, comparable to the contemporaneous hall architecture. The grid of the temple of Magnesia was based on a 12-by-12-foot (3.7 m × 3.7 m) square. The peristasis was surrounded by 8 × 15 columns or 7 × 14 intercolumniations, i.e. a 1:2 proportion. The naos consisted of a pronaos of four column depths, a four-column naos, and a two-column opisthodomos. Above the architrave of the peristasis, there was a figural frieze of 137 m length, depicting the amazonomachy. Above it lay the dentil, the Ionic geison and the sima.

===== Attic Ionic =====
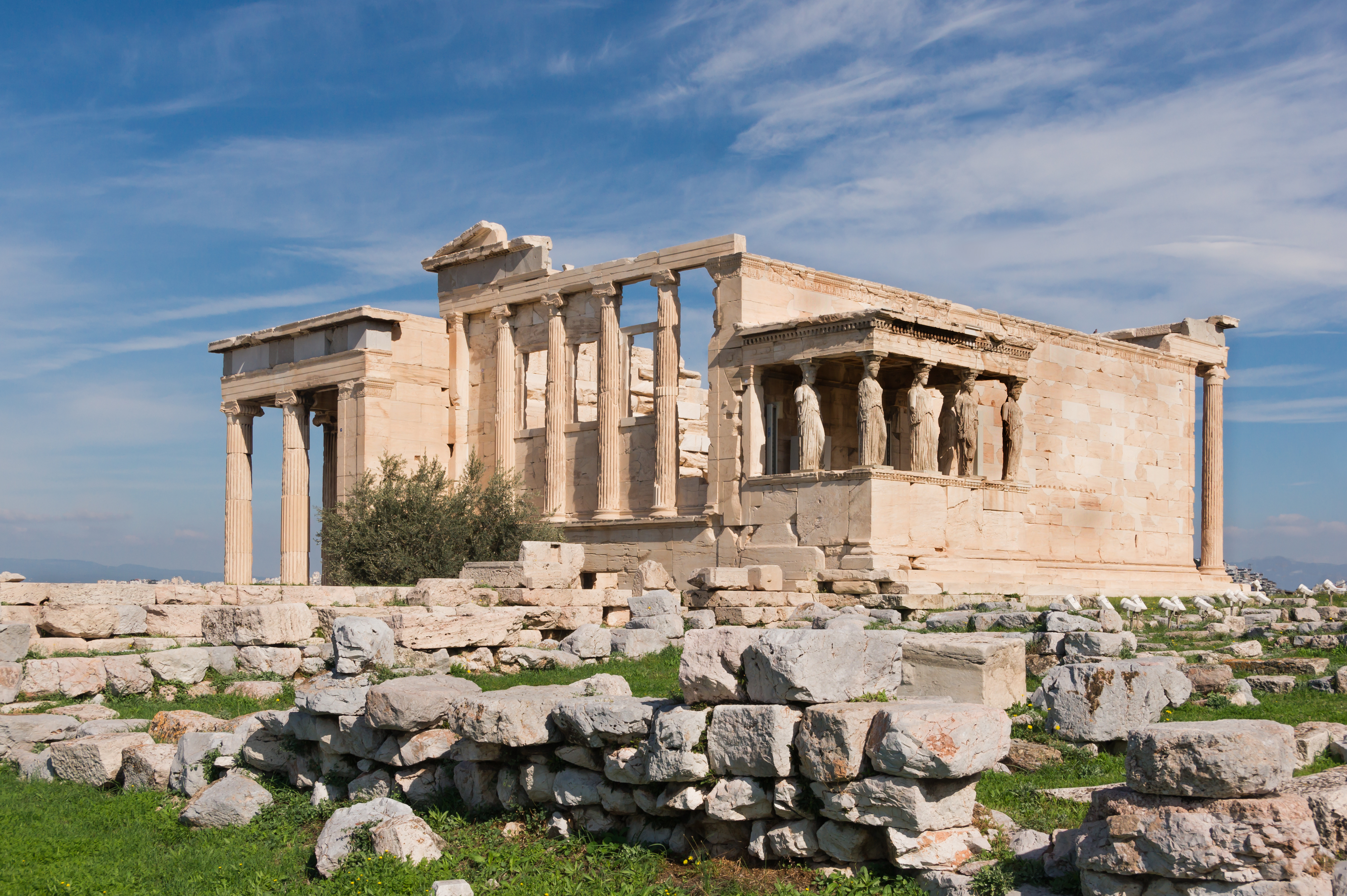
The Erechtheion at Athens.

Although Athens and Attica were also ethnically Ionian, the Ionic order was of minor importance in this area. The Temple of Nike Aptera on the Acropolis, a small amphiprostyle temple completed around 420, with Ionic columns on plinthless Attic bases, a triple-layered architrave and a figural frieze, but without the typical Ionic dentil, is notable. The east and north halls of the Erechtheion, completed in 406, follow the same succession of elements.

===== Epidauros =====
An innovative Ionic temple was that of Asklepios in Epidaurus, one of the first of the pseudoperipteros type. This small ionic prostyle temple had engaged columns along the sides and back, the peristasis was thus reduced to a mere hint of a full portico facade.

===== Magna Graecia =====
There is very little evidence of Ionic temples in Magna Graecia. One of the few exceptions is the early Classical Temple D, an 8 × 20-column peripteros, at Metapontum. Its architect combined the dentils, typical of Asia Minor, with an Attic frieze, thus proving that the colonies were quite capable of partaking in the developments of the motherland. A small Ionic Hellenistic prostyle temple was found on the Poggetto San Nicola at Agrigento.

===== Hellenistic India =====
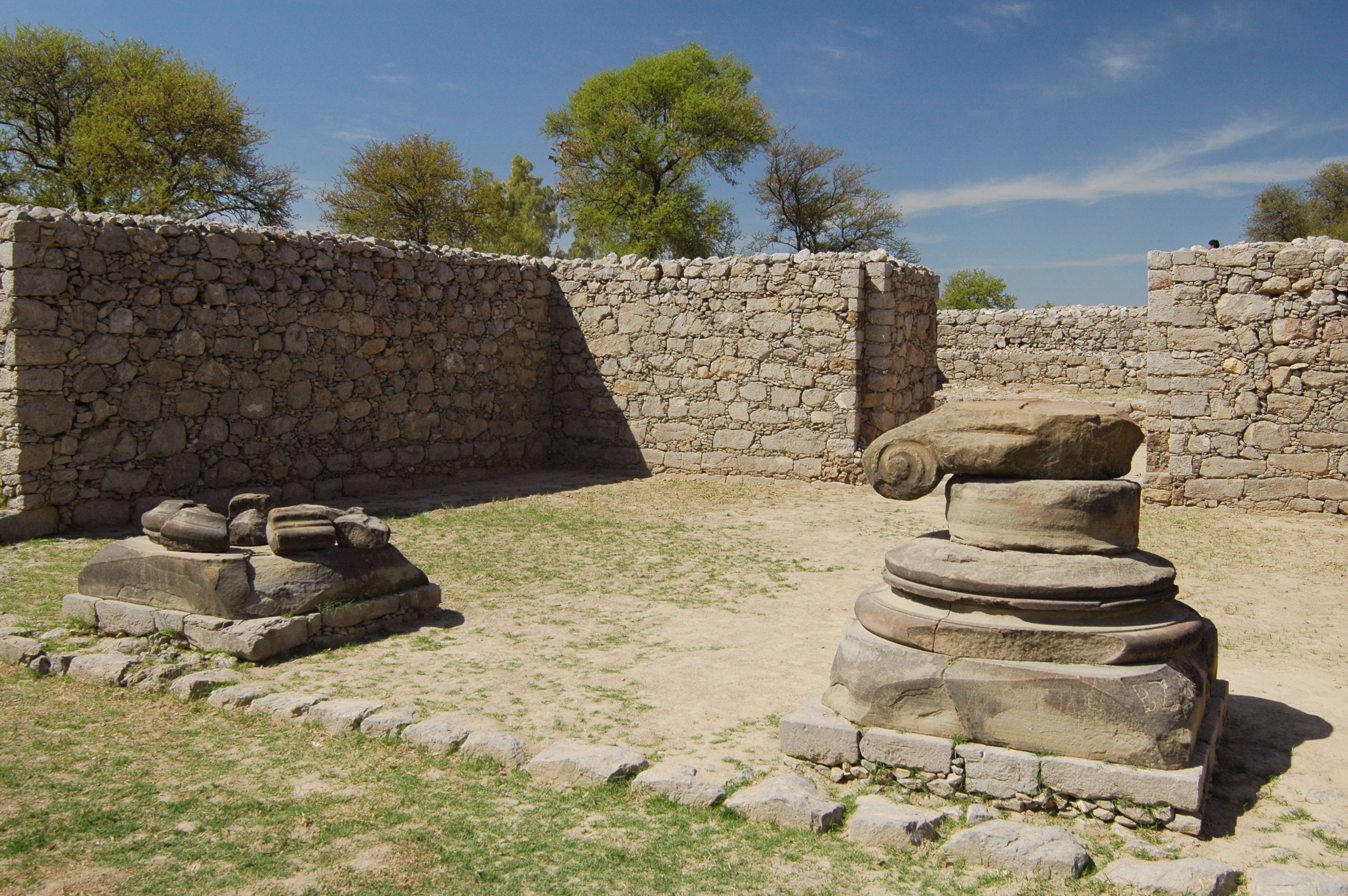
The Hellenistic temple with Ionic columns at Jandial, Taxila, Pakistan.

Ruins of a provincial Ionic temple with a design very similar to those in the main Greek world survives at Jandial in modern Pakistan. The temple is considered semi-classical, with a plan essentially that of a Greek temple, with a naos, pronaos and an opisthodomos at the back. Two Ionic columns at the front are framed by two anta walls as in a Greek distyle in antis layout. It seems that the temple had an outside wall with windows or doorways, in a layout similar to that of a Greek encircling row of columns (peripteral design). It has been called "the most Hellenic structure yet found on Indian soil".

=== Corinthian temples ===
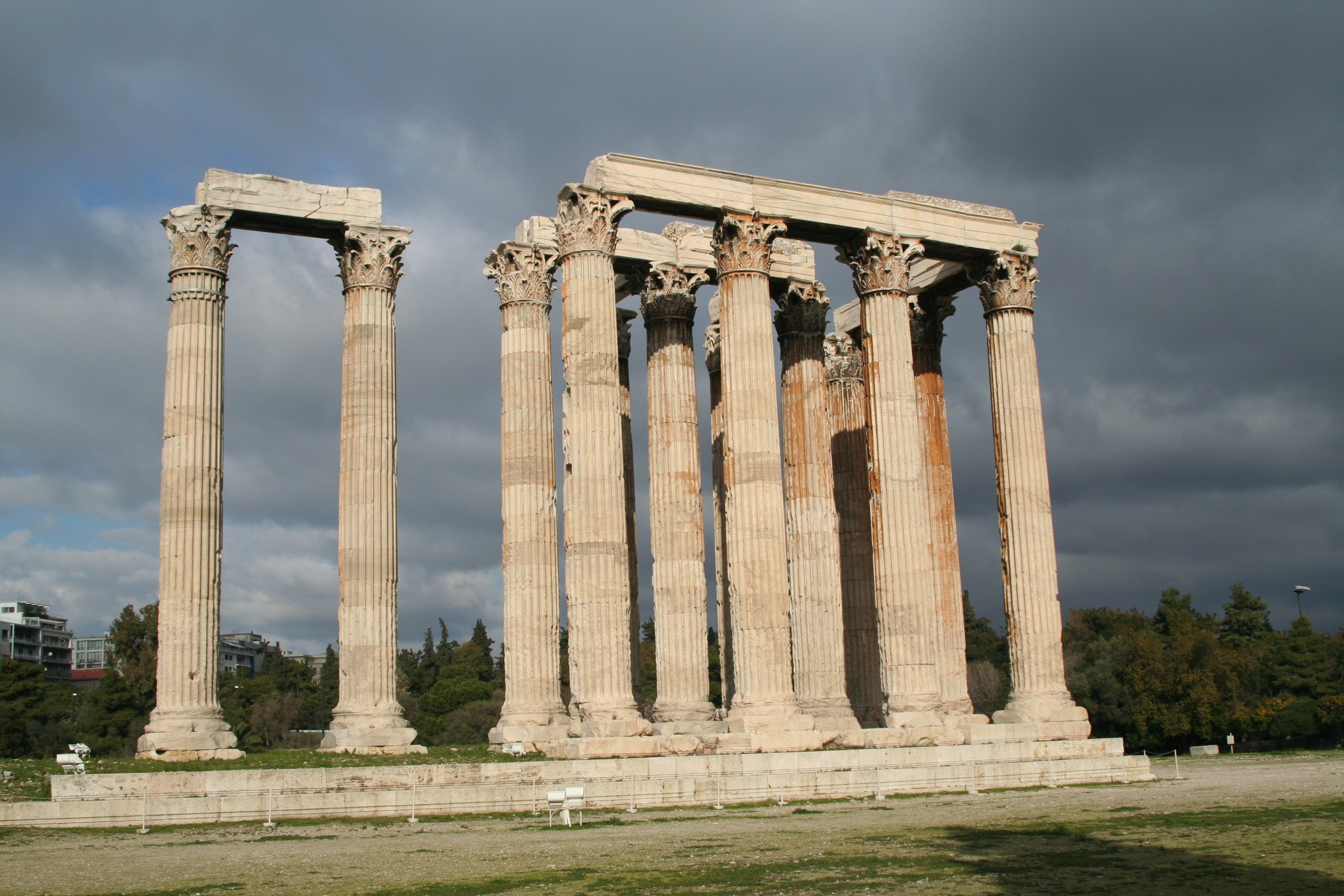
The Olympieion at Athens.

==== Beginnings ====
The youngest of the three Classical Greek orders, the Corinthian order came to be used for the external design of Greek temples quite late. After it had proved its adequacy, e.g. on a mausoleum of at modern-day Belevi (near Ephesos), it appears to have found increasing popularity in the last half of the 3rd century. Early examples probably include the Serapeum of Alexandria and a temple at Hermopolis Magna, both erected by Ptolemaios III. A small temple of Athena Limnastis at Messene, definitely Corinthian, is only attested through drawings by early travellers and very scarce fragments. It probably dates to the late 3rd century.

==== Examples ====
===== Hellenistic Temple of Olympian Zeus, Athens =====
The first dateable and well-preserved presence of the Corinthian temple is the Hellenistic rebuilding of the Olympieion of Athens, planned and started between 175 and 146 BC. This mighty dipteros with its 110 × 44 m substructure and 8 × 20 columns was to be one of the largest Corinthian temples ever. Donated by Antiochus IV Epiphanes, it combined all elements of the Asian/Ionic order with the Corinthian capital. Its Asian elements and its conception as a dipteros made the temple an exception in Athens.

===== Olba =====
Around the middle of the 2nd century BC, a 6 × 12-column Corinthian peripteros was built in Olba-Diokaisarea in Rugged Cilicia. Its columns, mostly still upright, stand on Attic bases without plinths, exceptional for the period. The 24 flutings of the columns are only indicated by facets in the lower third. Each of the Corinthian capitals is made of three separate parts, an exceptional form. The entablature of the temple was probably in the Doric order, as is suggested by fragments of mutuli scattered among the ruins. All of these details suggest an Alexandrian workshop, since Alexandria showed the greatest tendency to combine Doric entablatures with Corinthian capitals and to do without the plinth under Attic bases.

===== Temple of Hekate at Lagina =====
A further plan option is shown by the temple of Hekate at Lagina, a small pseudoperipteros of 8 × 11 columns. Its architectural members are entirely in keeping with the Asian/Ionic canon. Its distinctive feature, a rich figural frieze, makes this building, erected around 100 BC, an architectural gem. Further late Greek temples in the Corinthian order are known e.g. at Mylasa and, on the middle gymnasium terrace at Pergamon.

==== Distinctive uses of Corinthian temples, influence ====
The few Greek temples in the Corinthian order are almost always exceptional in form or ground plan and are initially usually an expression of royal patronage. The Corinthian order permitted a considerable increase of the material and technical effort invested in a building, which made its use attractive for the purposes of royals' self-aggrandisement. The demise of the Hellenistic monarchies and the increasing power of Rome and her allies placed mercantile elites and sanctuary administrations in the positions of building sponsors. The construction of Corinthian temples became a typical expression of self-confidence and independence. As an element of Roman architecture, the Corinthian temple came to be widely distributed in all of the Graeco-Roman world, especially in Asia Minor, until the late Imperial period.

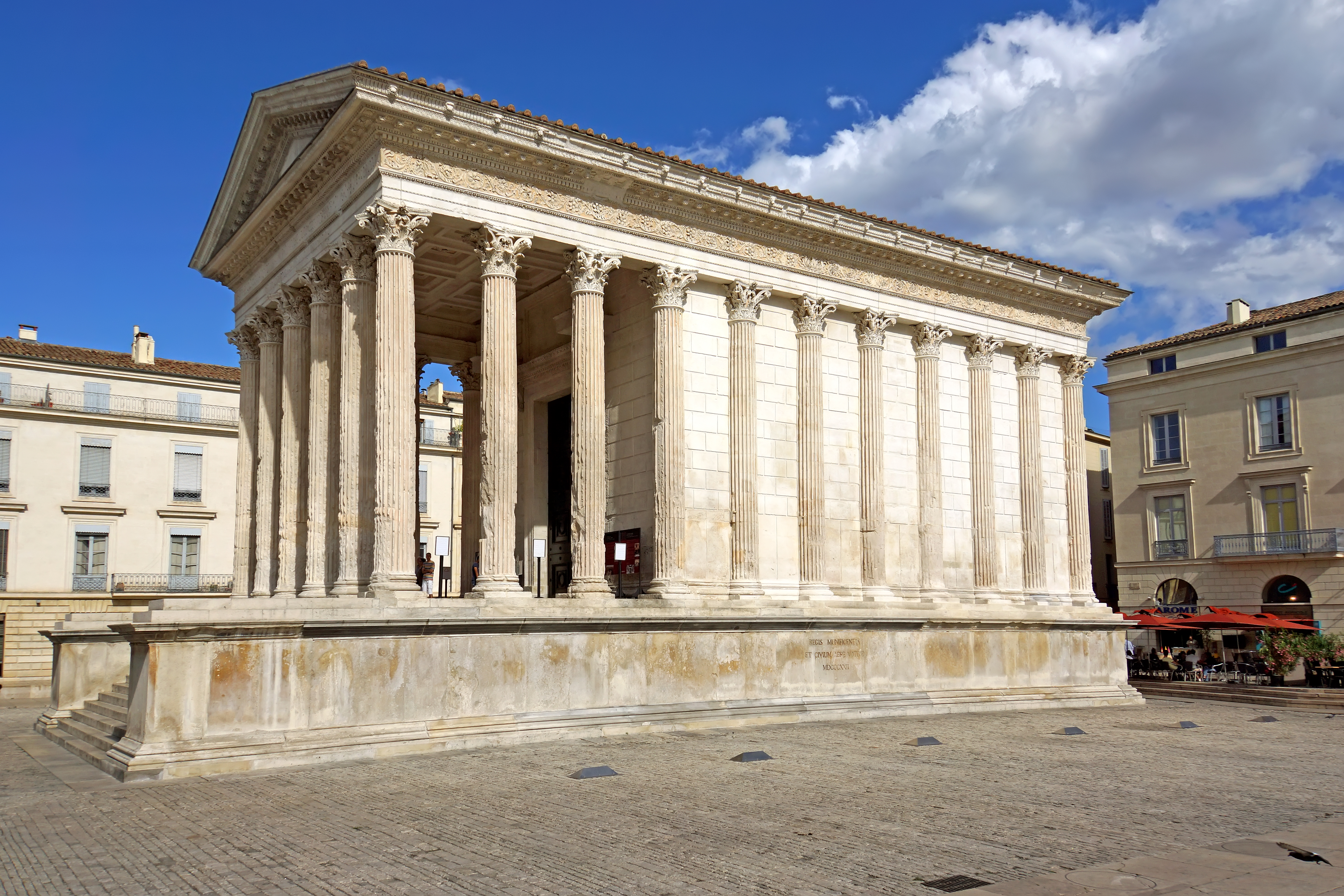
The Maison Carrée at Nîmes (France), from 16 BC, a typical Roman temple, is a Corinthian hexaystyle pseudoperipteros.

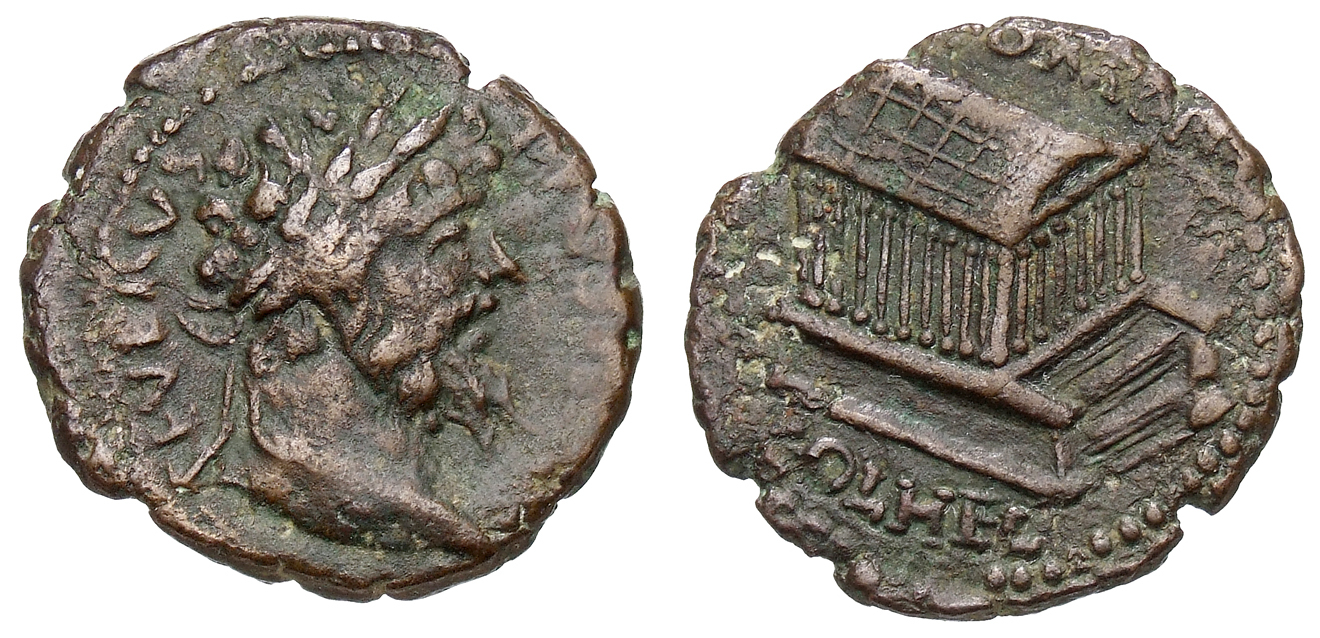
Temple of Jupiter at Heliopolis (today Baalbek, Lebanon) in three-quarter view on podium with wide staircase and corinthian orders, 193-211 AD.

== Surviving remains ==
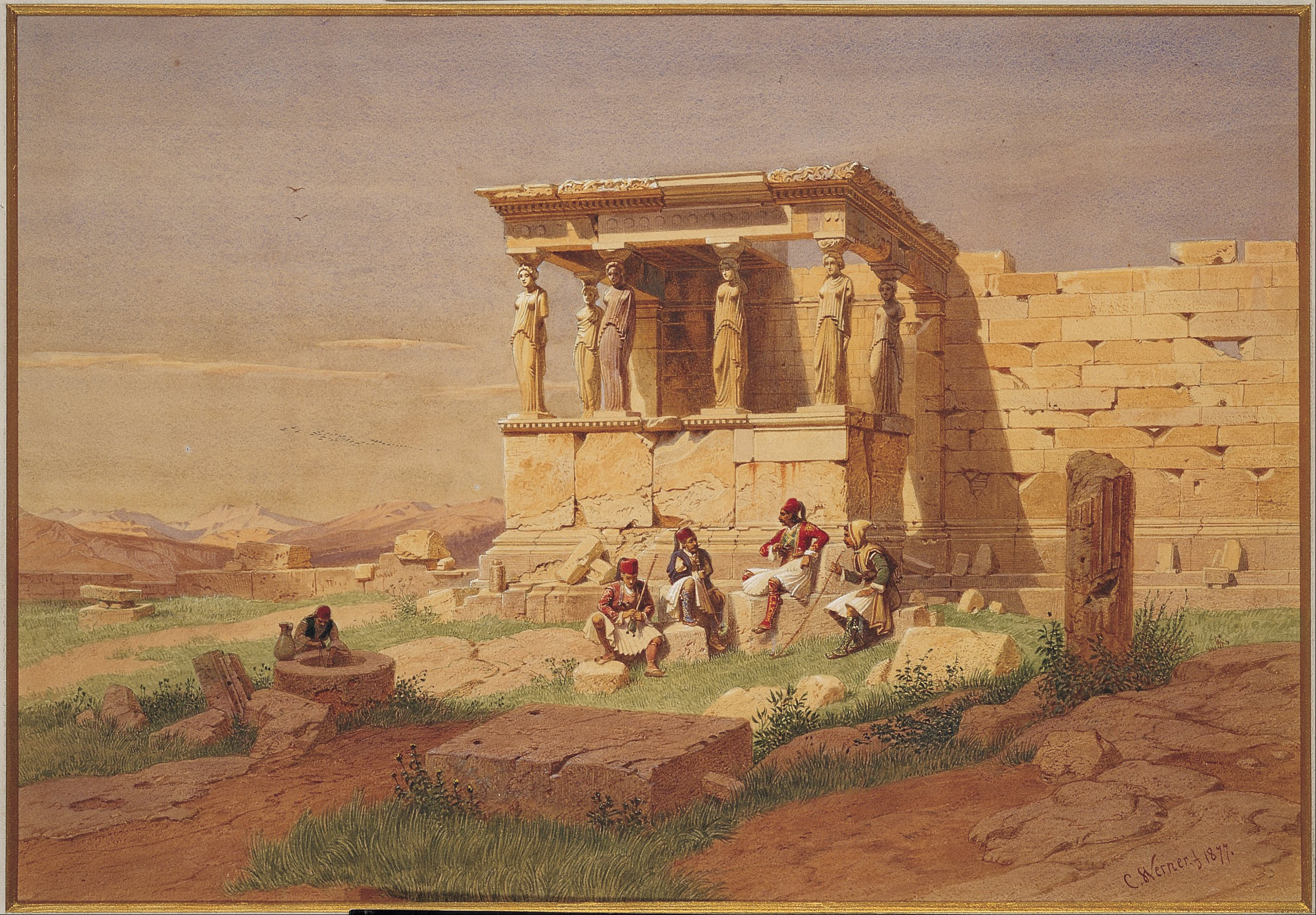
Painting of the Erechtheion, by Werner Carl-Friedrich, from 1877

Though extremely solidly built, apart from the roof, relatively few Greek temples have left very significant remains; these are often those which were converted to other uses such as churches or mosques. There are many where the platforms are reasonably complete, and some round drum elements of the columns, which were harder for later builders to re-use. The somewhat controversial practice of anastylosis, or re-erecting fallen materials, has sometimes been used. The rectangular wall blocks have usually been carried off for re-use, and some buildings have been destroyed or weakened merely to get the bronze pins linking blocks. Marble sculpture has often been removed to make lime for mortar, and any that has survived has usually been removed to a museum, not always a local one.

The most complete remains are concentrated in Athens and southern Italy; several are described in more detail above, under their orders. Athens has the Parthenon and the even better preserved Doric Temple of Hephaestus, both once churches, as well two small temples on the Acropolis and a corner of the large Corinthian Temple of Olympian Zeus. The small temple of Apollo Epicurius at Bassae survived in a rural location with most of its columns and main architrave blocks in place, amid a jumble of fallen stone. From this British antiquaries extracted the Bassae Frieze in 1812, which was soon in the British Museum.

In Italy, Paestum, some way south of Naples near what was once the northern limit of Magna Graecia (Greek Italy), has three early Doric temples in a row, amid the mostly Roman ruins of the city. In Sicily the Valle dei Templi near Agrigento has an even larger group, with the main structure of the Temple of Concordia especially well-preserved. Along the coast Selinunte was destroyed about 250 BC by the Carthaginians and has the tumbled ruins of five temples, of which one has been rebuilt from the original material. Not far away, Segesta has a single Doric temple whose main structure is largely intact.

== See also ==
- Art in ancient Greece
- Glossary of architecture
- Greek culture
- Greek Revival architecture
- Ancient Greek technology
- List of ancient architectural records
- List of Ancient Greek temples
- List of Greco-Roman roofs
- List of Greek deities
- Roman temple
- Vitruvius

== Bibliography ==
English

- Jenkins, Ian. Greek Architecture and Its Sculpture. Cambridge: Harvard University Press, 2006.
- Martin, Roland. Greek Architecture. New York: Electa/Rizzoli, 1988.
- Miles, Margaret Melanie. A Companion to Greek Architecture. Malden, MA: John Wiley & Sons, 2016.
- Mikalson, Jon. Ancient Greek Religion. Wiley-Blackwell, 2010.
- Pollio, Marcus Vitruvius. "Marcus Vitruvius Pollio: De Architectura, Book IV." LacusCurtius • Vitruvius on Architecture - Book IV. Accessed November 27, 2022. https://penelope.uchicago.edu/Thayer/E/Roman/Texts/Vitruvius/4*.html.
- Scully, Vincent Joseph. The Earth, the Temple, and the Gods: Greek Sacred Architecture. Rev. ed. New Haven: Yale University Press, 1979.
- Tzonis, Alexander, and Phoivē Giannisē. Classical Greek Architecture: The Construction of the Modern. English-language ed. Paris: Flammarion, 2004.
- Yeroulanou, Marina. "Architecture in City and Sanctuary". In A Companion to Greek Art, edited by Tyler Jo Smith and Dimitris Plantzos, 132–52. Vol. 1. Somerset: Wiley, 2012.
- Zuchtriegel, Gabriel (20 April 2023). The Making of the Doric Temple: Architecture, Religion, and Social Change in Archaic Greece. Cambridge University Press. ISBN 9781009260107.

Foreign language

- Bietak, Manfred (ed.): Archaische Griechische Tempel und Altägypten. Österreichische Akademie der Wissenschaften, Wien 2001, ISBN 3-7001-2937-8
- Fuchs, Werner: Die Skulptur der Griechen. Hirmer, München 1983 (3. edn.), ISBN 3-7774-3460-4
- Gruben, Gottfried: Die Tempel der Griechen. Hirmer, München 2001 (5. edn.), ISBN 3-7774-8460-1
- Knell, Heiner: Architektur der Griechen: Grundzüge. Wiss. Buchges., Darmstadt 1988, ISBN 3-534-80028-1
- Lauter, Hans: Die Architektur des Hellenismus. Wiss. Buchges., Darmstadt 1986, ISBN 3-534-09401-8
- Mertens, Dieter: Der alte Heratempel in Paestum und die archaische Baukunst in Unteritalien. 1993.
- Müller-Wiener, Wolfgang: Griechisches Bauwesen in der Antike. C. H. Beck, München 1988, ISBN 3-406-32993-4
- Schenk, Ralf: Der korinthische Tempel bis zum Ende des Prinzipats des Augustus. Internationale Archäologie Vol. 45, 1997, ISBN 978-3-89646-317-3
