= Travellers Club =

Gentlemen's club in London, England

- Founded: 1819; 207 years ago
- Type: Gentlemen's club
- Headquarters: 106 Pall Mall
- Location: London, England
- Coordinates: 51°30′24.9″N 0°7′59.4″W
- Website: thetravellersclub.org.uk

The Travellers Club is a private gentlemen's club situated at 106 Pall Mall in London, United Kingdom. It is the oldest of the surviving Pall Mall clubs, established in 1819, and is one of the most exclusive. It was described as "the quintessential English gentleman's club" by the Los Angeles Times in 2004.

== Purpose ==
The original concept for the club, conceived by Lord Castlereagh and others, dates from the conclusion of the Napoleonic Wars. They envisaged a club where gentlemen who travelled abroad could meet and offer hospitality to distinguished foreign visitors. The original rules from 1819 excluded from membership anyone "who has not travelled out of the British islands to a distance of at least five hundred miles from London in a direct line".

== Membership ==
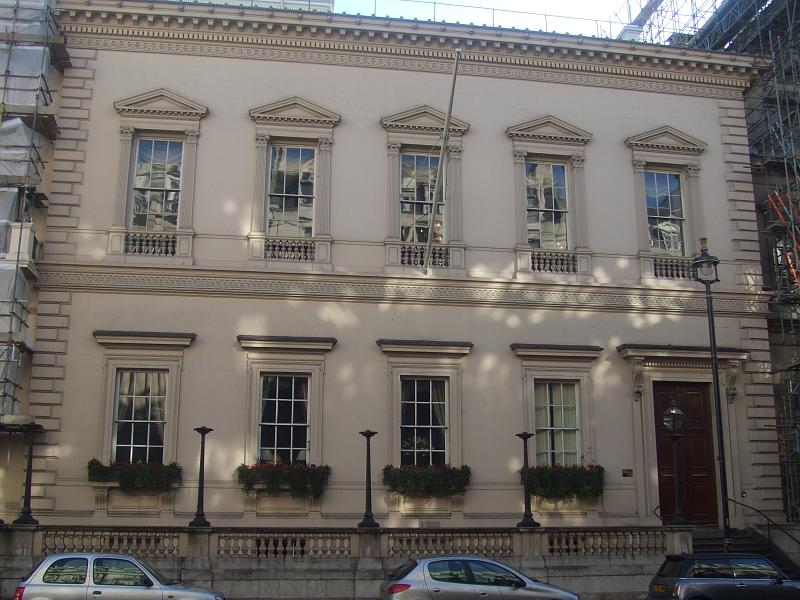
The 1826 clubhouse at 106 Pall Mall, designed by Sir Charles Barry

The members of the club's first Committee included the Earl of Aberdeen (later Prime Minister), Lord Auckland (after whom Auckland, New Zealand is named), the Marquess of Lansdowne (who had already served as Chancellor of the Exchequer and later refused office as Prime Minister) and Viscount Palmerston (later Foreign Secretary and Prime Minister).

Subsequent members included statesmen and travellers such as Prime Minister George Canning, the Duke of Wellington, Lord John Russell, Prime Minister Arthur Balfour, Prime Minister Stanley Baldwin, Prime Minister Alec Douglas-Home, Francis Beaufort (creator of the Beaufort scale), Robert FitzRoy of HMS Beagle, Sir William Edward Parry (explorer of the Northwest Passage), Sir Roderick Murchison (after whom the Murchison crater on the Moon is named) and Sir Wilfred Thesiger. Novelist Anthony Powell was a member, and the club is featured in various guises in the work of Graham Greene, Jules Verne, William Makepeace Thackeray and John le Carré.

The club's members include members of the British and foreign royal families, the British Foreign Secretary whilst in office, and various ambassadors to London; a tradition still continued today. Past ambassador members included Prince Talleyrand, for whom the club fitted an extra handrail to the stairs (still there) because of his club foot, and Joachim von Ribbentrop, the only member of the club to have been hanged.

There is also a special category of membership for particularly distinguished travellers, explorers and travel writers. Such well-known recent members include the late Field Marshal Lord Bramall, and Terry Waite. Its membership remains exclusive, although there are a number of reciprocal arrangements with other clubs throughout the world whose members may use its premises occasionally.

Justin Welby, then archbishop of Canterbury, announced in 2014 that he would resign from the club, owing to its refusal to admit women.

== Premises ==
The club's original premises were at 12 Waterloo Place. It moved to 49 Pall Mall in 1821 (a building which had once been occupied by Brooks's). However, it quickly outgrew this building and in 1826 the members decided to spend £25,000 on the construction of a purpose built club house on the present site at 106 Pall Mall, backing onto Carlton gardens.

The architect was Sir Charles Barry who was later to be the architect for the Houses of Parliament, and the Travellers Club building proved to be one of his masterpieces. It takes the form of a Renaissance palace which is said to have been inspired by Raphael's Palazzo Pandolfini in Florence. It was completed in 1832, with the tower (which had been in Barry's original design) added in 1842.

The club building includes a smoking room (a large common room which looks over Carlton Gardens), the cocktail bar and adjacent Bramall room (which gives access to Carlton Gardens), the Outer Morning Room (a large drawing room overlooking Pall Mall, and connecting to an Inner Morning Room), and the dining room (known as the Coffee Room). The Times on 10 January 2004 noted "the wonderful dining, heavy on fish and game (partridges to potted shrimps) with echoes of public school food (bread pudding) and a superb wine cellar".

The library is decorated with a cast of the Bassae Frieze from the 5th century BCE Greek temple of Apollo Epicurius at Bassae. The originals of this frieze were discovered by the architect Charles Robert Cockerell, who was on the first Committee of the Club in 1819, and they are now in the British Museum. The library has a large and important collection of books, from the antiquarian to the modern, mainly on travel.

There are a number of bedrooms at the club for out-of-town members. The dress code is formal at all times.

== See also ==
- List of London's gentlemen's clubs
