= Corn Exchange, Liverpool =

Commercial building in Liverpool, Merseyside, England

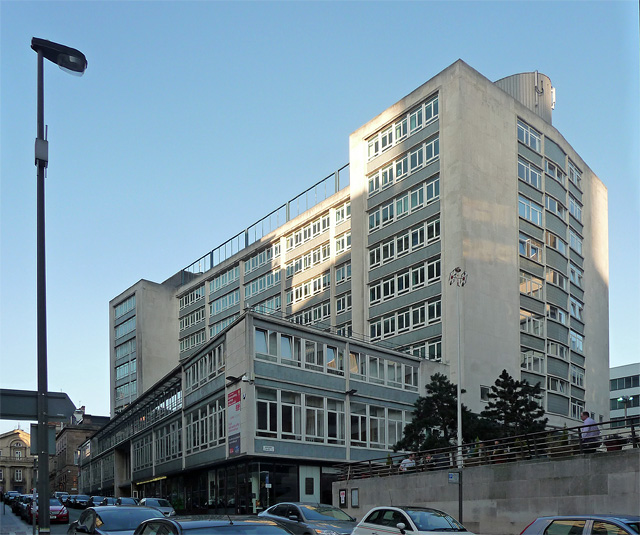
- Corn Exchange, Liverpool

- Shown in Merseyside
- 53.4055°N 2.9921°W
- Location: Drury Lane, Liverpool

History
- Built: 1959

Site notes
- Architect: Harold Hinchcliffe Davies
- Architectural style: Modernist style

The Corn Exchange is a commercial building in Drury Lane in Liverpool, Merseyside, England. The structure has been converted into apartments and studios.

== History ==
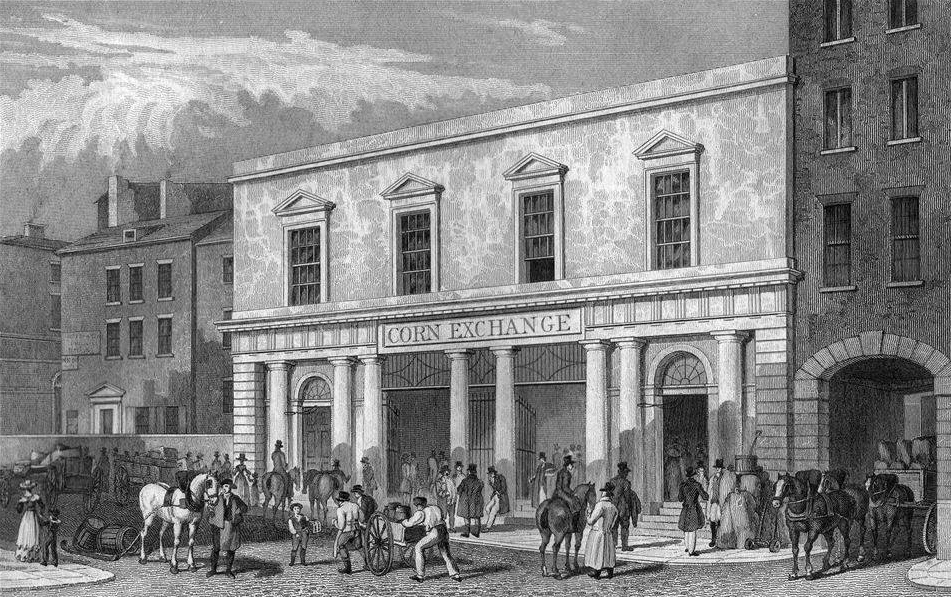
The corn exchange of 1808

In the 18th century, the local corn merchants carried out their business in the open space in front of Liverpool Town Hall. However, in the early 19th century, a group of the merchants decided to form a company, to be known as the "Liverpool Corn Exchange Limited", to finance and commission a purpose-built corn exchange.

The new building was designed by John Foster Sr in the neoclassical style, built in white stone from Runcorn at a cost of £10,000 and was officially opened in August 1808. The design involved a symmetrical main frontage of four bays facing onto Brunswick Street. The central section of two bays featured two large openings while the outer bays contained round headed doorways with fanlights. The bays were all flanked by Doric order columns, which supported an entablature, which was decorated with triglyphs, as well as a central panel inscribed with the words "Corn Exchange". The first floor was fenestrated by sash windows with triangular pediments.

There was a serious accident in June 1852, when the floor in the middle of the building gave way. Following the accident, the corn exchange was rebuilt to a design by Sir James Picton between 1853 and 1854. However, the use of the building as a corn exchange declined significantly in the wake of the Great Depression of British Agriculture in the late 19th century.

After the First World War, a plaque to commemorate the lives of members of the Liverpool Corn Exchange who had died in the war was installed in the Church of Our Lady and Saint Nicholas in Chapel Street. The corn exchange was completely destroyed by German bombing in the Liverpool Blitz in May 1941 during the Second World War.

After the war, civic leaders decided to rebuild the structure again. The foundation stone for the new building was laid by the Chancellor of the Duchy of Lancaster, Frederick Marquis, 1st Earl of Woolton, on 19 June 1953. In his speech, Woolton observed that "The history of the Liverpool Corn Exchange is the history of the corn trade of the United Kingdom. It is the history of adventure and enterprise that made Liverpool the largest market for foreign wheat in the World." The new building was designed by Harold Hinchcliffe Davies in the modernist style, clad in Portland stone and completed in 1959.

The design involved a three-storey podium on Drury Lane, which reduced to two storeys on Fenwick Street because of the sloping site, and a seven-storey tower, which rose above the podium. The main frontages of the tower, on Drury Lane and Fenwick Street, featured sections of three bays which were faced in alternating bands of glass and green faience panelling, flanked by sections which were canted and faced in Portland stone. Internally, the principal room was the main trading hall, which was located inside the podium.

In the latter part of the 20th century, the building was largely used as offices. However, in March 2016, Liverpool City Council approved plans from a Dublin-based hotel developer, Staycity, to convert the building into some 200 new apartments and studios, all equipped with bedroom furniture, showers and fitted kitchens. Staycity was granted a long-term lease on the building the following month. After the conversion was completed, the building re-opened in October 2018.

== See also ==
- Corn exchanges in England
