= John Foster Sr. (engineer) =

English engineer (1759–1827)

John Foster
- Born: 1759
- Died: 27 April 1827 (aged 67–68); Liverpool, England
- Occupations: Architect; engineer
- Children: 3, including John Jr

John Foster Sr. (1759– 27 April 1827) was an English engineer and architect, father of John Foster Jr. He was Senior Surveyor to the Corporation of Liverpool. In the early 1820s he was responsible for the extensive remodelling of Liverpool's Blue Coat School, adding the curved wall and new chapel to the rear. In 1824 he was succeeded as Senior Surveyor by his son while Jesse Hartley replaced him as dock engineer at Liverpool Dock Trustees.

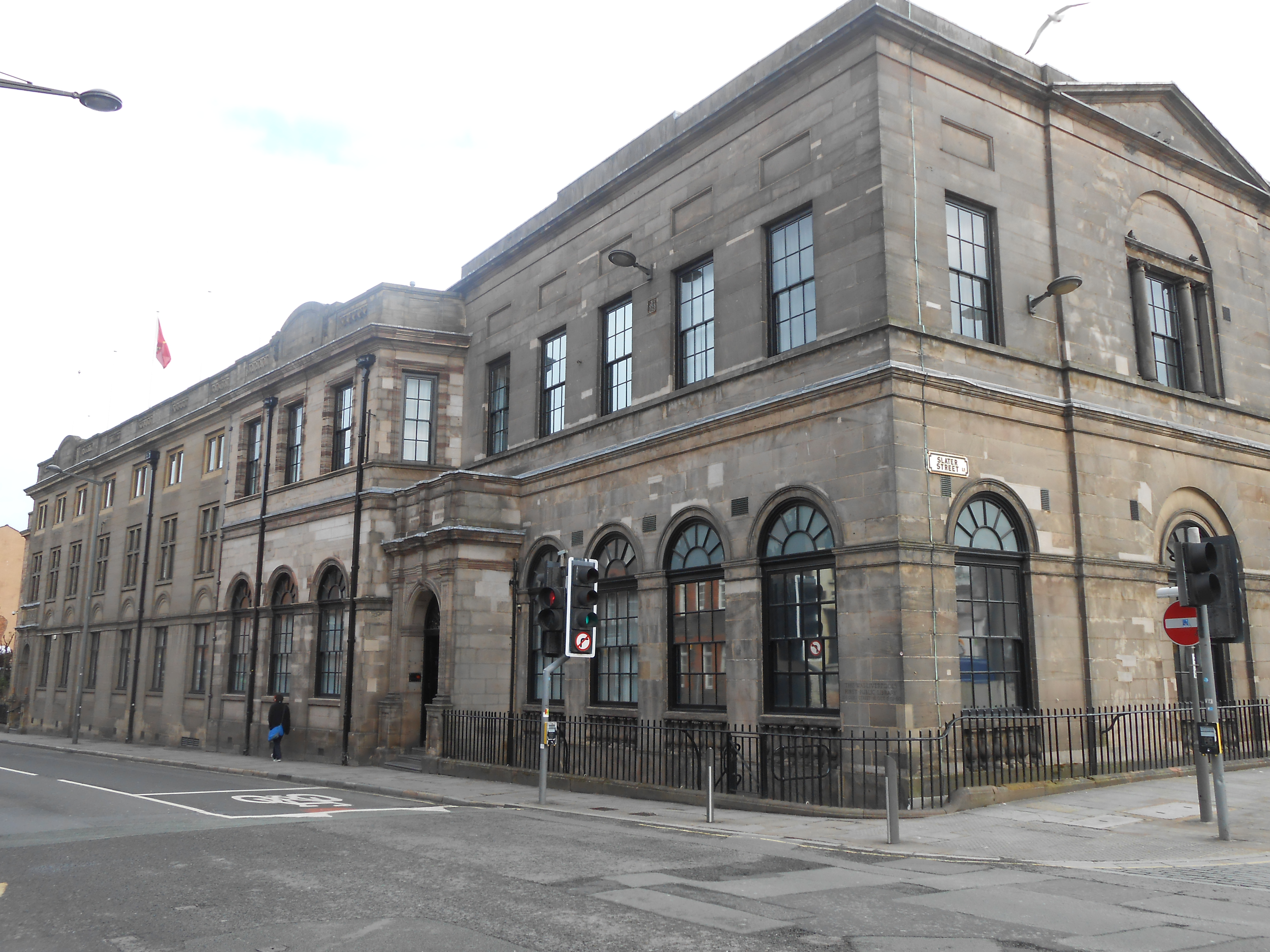
The Union Newsroom, 105 Duke Street, Liverpool, England

During his time as dock engineer, Foster completed only one dock (Prince's Dock). He also converted Manchester Basin to an enclosed dock (Manchester Dock) and expanded several other docks including George's Dock and Queen's Dock. The warehouse at King's Dock was built by Foster.

He designed St Luke's Church in Liverpool in 1802, later to be completed by his son, John. He also designed the Athenaeum (1799), the Union Newsroom (1800) on Duke Street, Liverpool Town Hall (1802), the Corn Exchange (1807), and enlarged Leasowe Castle in 1818.

Foster had three sons. His eldest son Thomas (d. 1836) became Liverpool's town clerk, William who was Secretary to the Dock Committee, and John who also worked as an architect in Liverpool.

Preceded by Thomas Morris	Engineer to Mersey Docks and Harbour Board; 1799–1824	Succeeded by Jesse Hartley
Preceded by Charles Eyes	Surveyor to the Corporation of Liverpool; 1790–1824	Succeeded by John Foster Jr. (1824-1835)
