= John Foster Jr (architect) =

English architect (1786–1846)

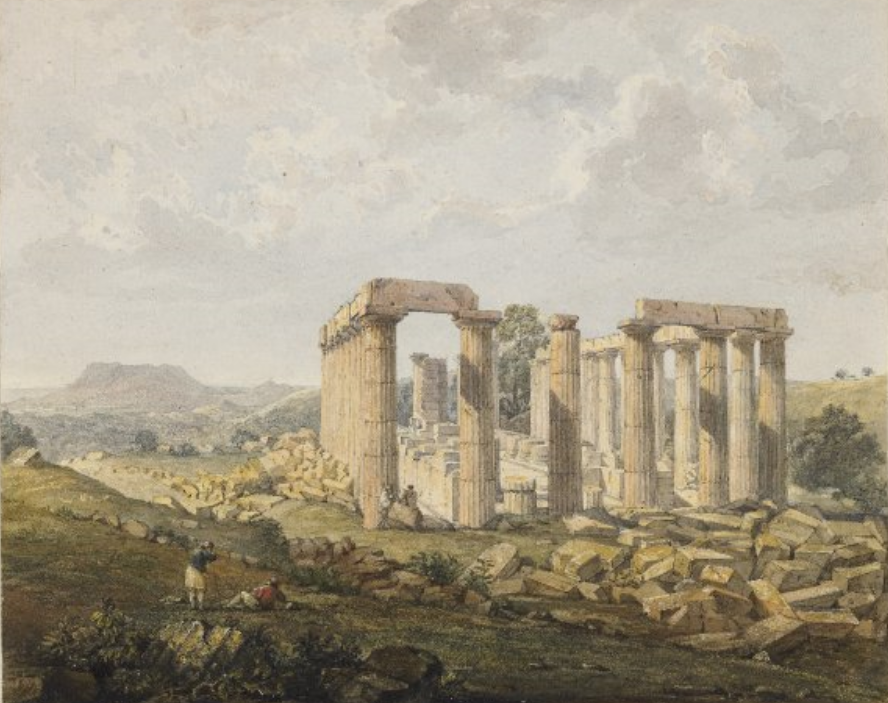
Bassae Temple of Apollo by John Foster 1820

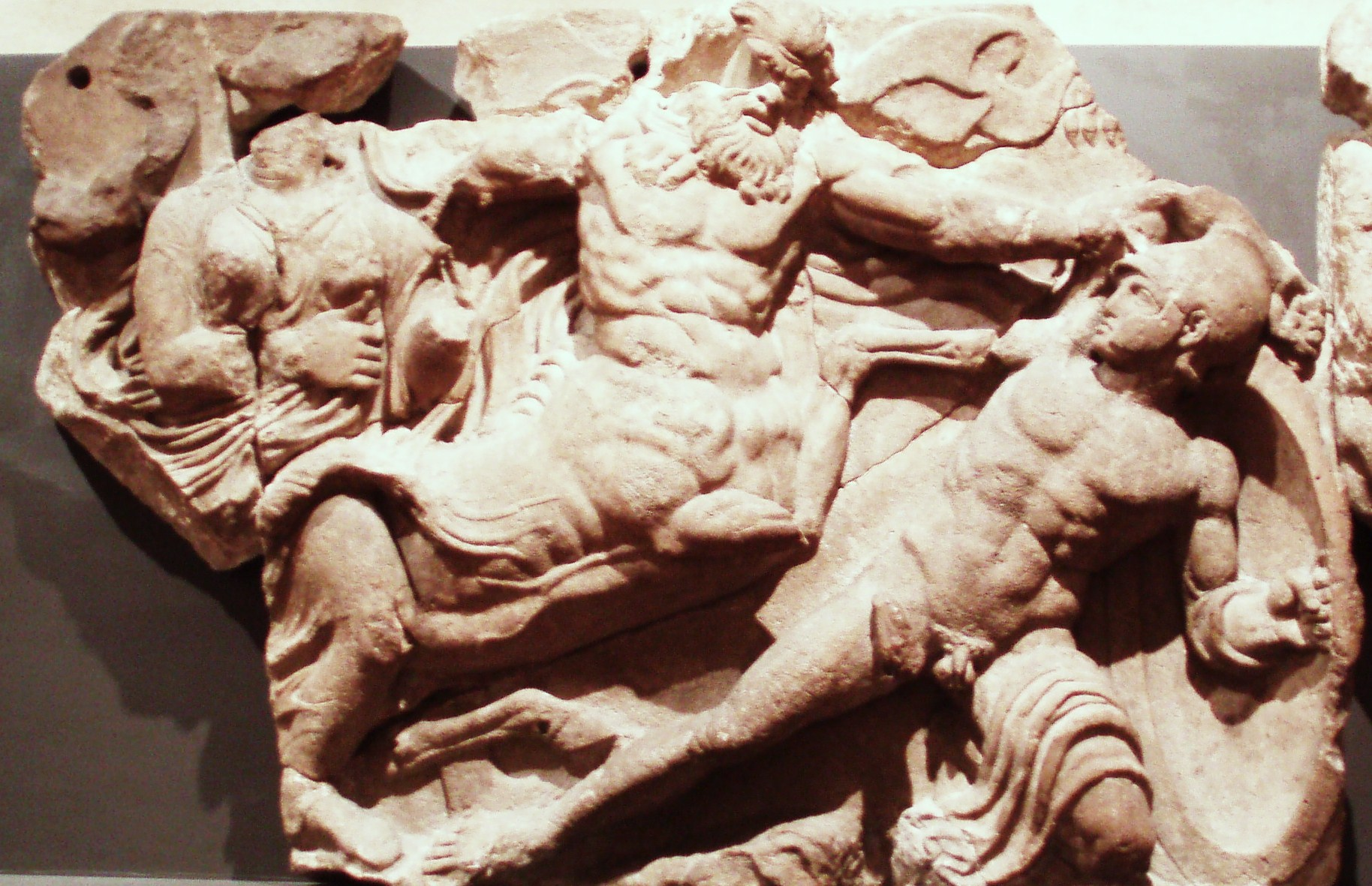
A sample from the Bassae Frieze that Foster brought to England

This is about the architect. For his father, see John Foster, Sr.

John Foster, Junior (1786 – 21 August 1846) was an English architect based in Liverpool. In succession to his father, he was Surveyor to the Corporation of Liverpool (1824–1835). His work, mainly in the Greek Revival style, focused on public buildings and Anglican churches.

In 1812 Foster travelled to Greece and joined Charles Robert Cockerell at the Temple of Apollo Epicurius in Bassae, where the expedition removed the sculpted frieze. The antiquities were clandestinely shipped to Zakynthos and later sold at auction in London. Contemporary accounts and modern scholarship describe the removal as smuggling and plunder, and in 1815 the British Museum purchased the frieze from Foster and his associates.

== Biography ==
John Foster Sr. married Ann Dutton on 18 September 1781 in St George's Church, Liverpool. John Foster Jr. is the second of eight sons born to the couple in 1786 in Liverpool. Foster studied under Jeffry Wyatt in Lower Brook Street, London, whose uncle James Wyatt had worked with John Sr. on Liverpool Town Hall.

John Jr. displayed three designs at Royal Academy of Arts, in 1805 a design for a Mausoleum, in 1806 a design for a National Museum and in 1807 a Public Library or National Gallery. During 1810-11 he travelled extensively through southern Europe and the Mediterranean studying classical architecture and accompanied C. R. Cockerell and the German archaeologists Haller and Linckh during their excavation of the temples at Aegina and Bassae. In 1816 John Jr. returned to Liverpool and joined the family building firm. He succeeded his father, John Foster, Sr., as senior surveyor to the Corporation of Liverpool in 1824, and held that post until the Municipal Reform Act 1835. His own designs included The Oratory, St. John's Market, Liverpool Necropolis (converted into a park in 1914), St James Cemetery, alterations and additions to Knowsley Hall, the grandstand at Aintree Racecourse and the Church of St. Andrew's in Rodney Street, converted in the early 21st century to student accommodation. The second Royal Infirmary and the public baths have both been demolished, as has the enormous, domed Custom House, which suffered extensive fire damage during the Second World War. He is often attributed as the architect for numbers 2–10 Gambier Terrace, Liverpool.

He was living in Hamilton Square, Birkenhead when he died in 1846 and was buried the cemetery, St James, he designed.

== Gallery of work ==
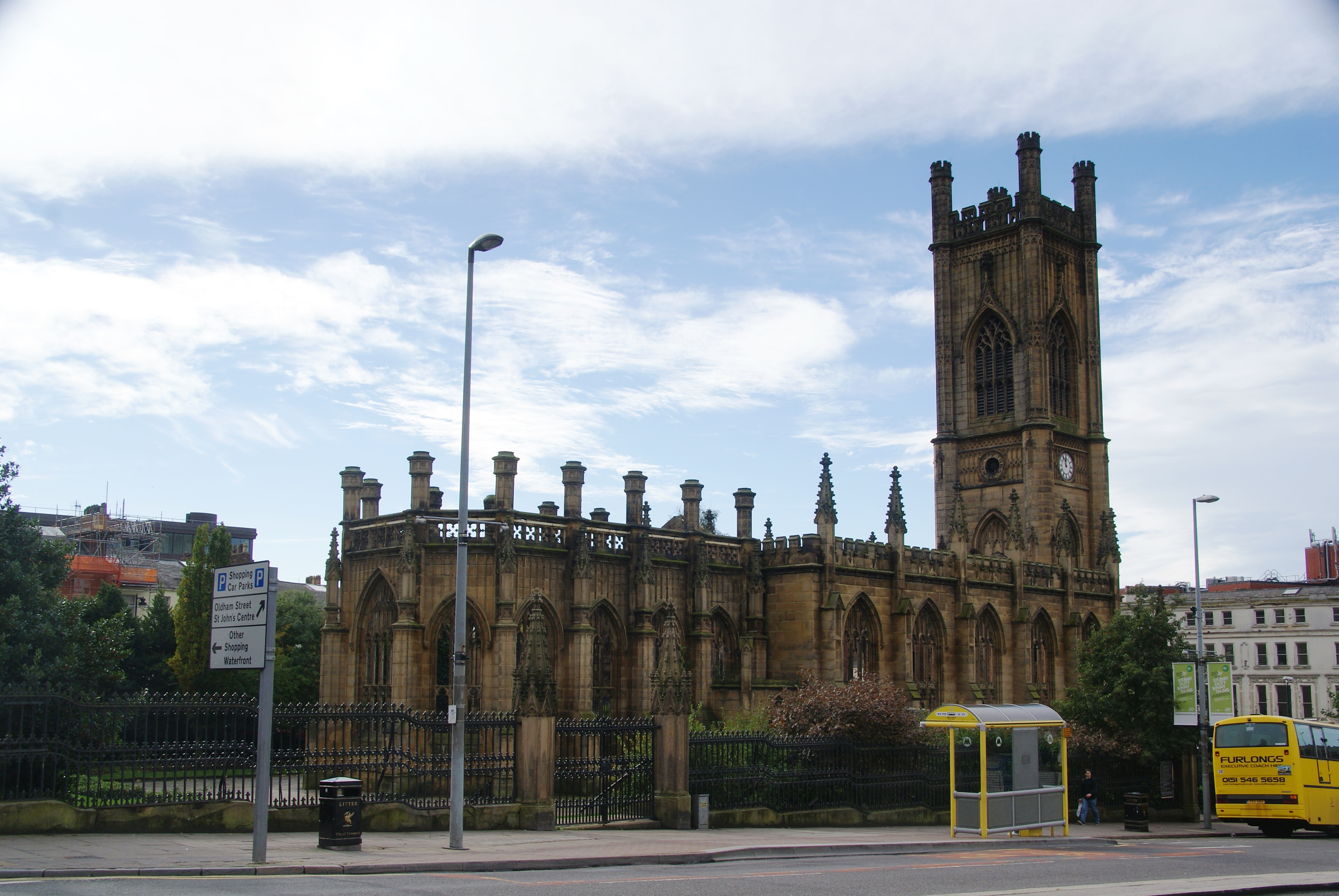
St Luke's Church, corner of Berry Street and Leece Street, Joint Work with his father
(1811–32; Grade II*)

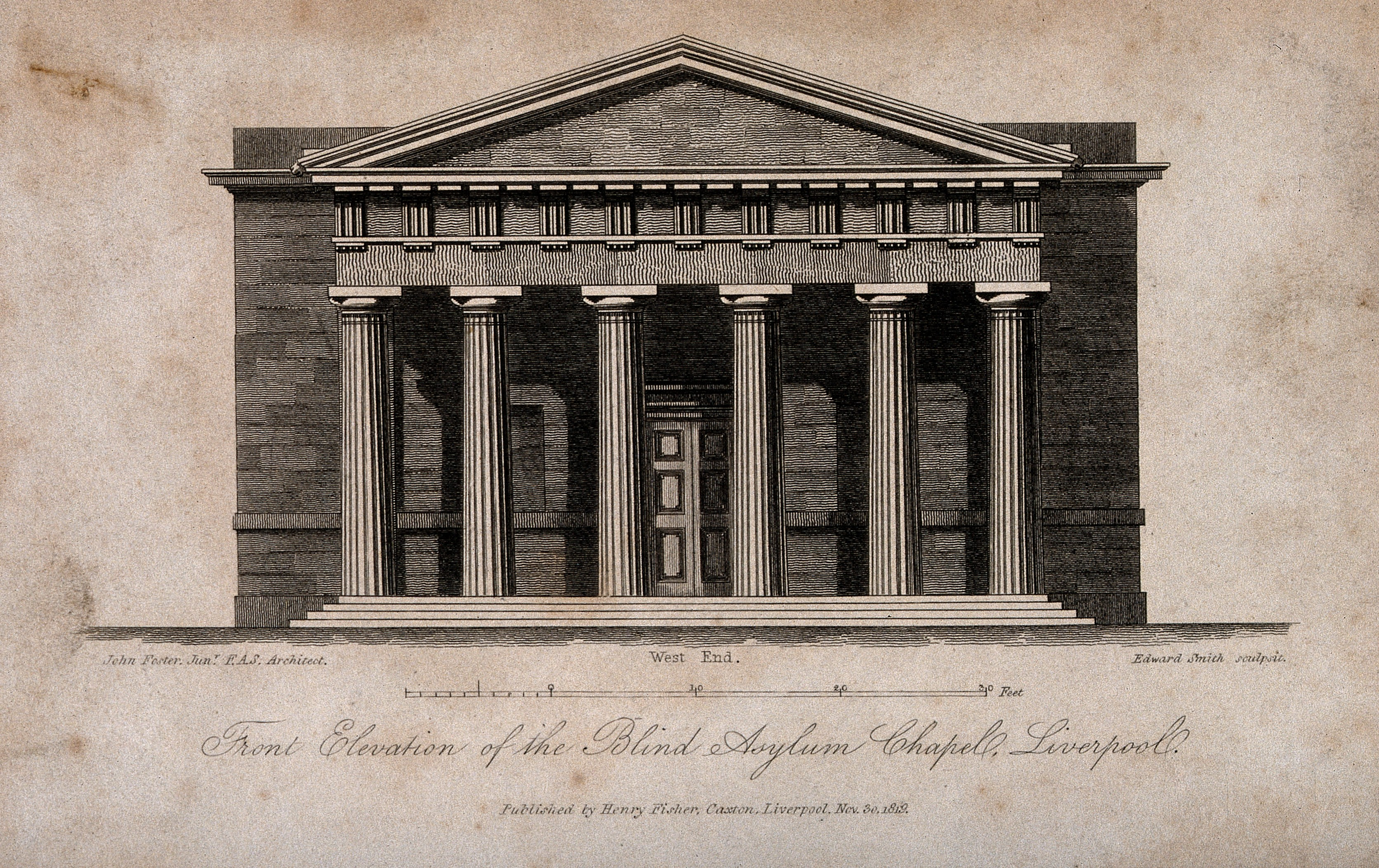
The Chapel, Blind Asylum, Hardman Street
(1819; demolished 1930)

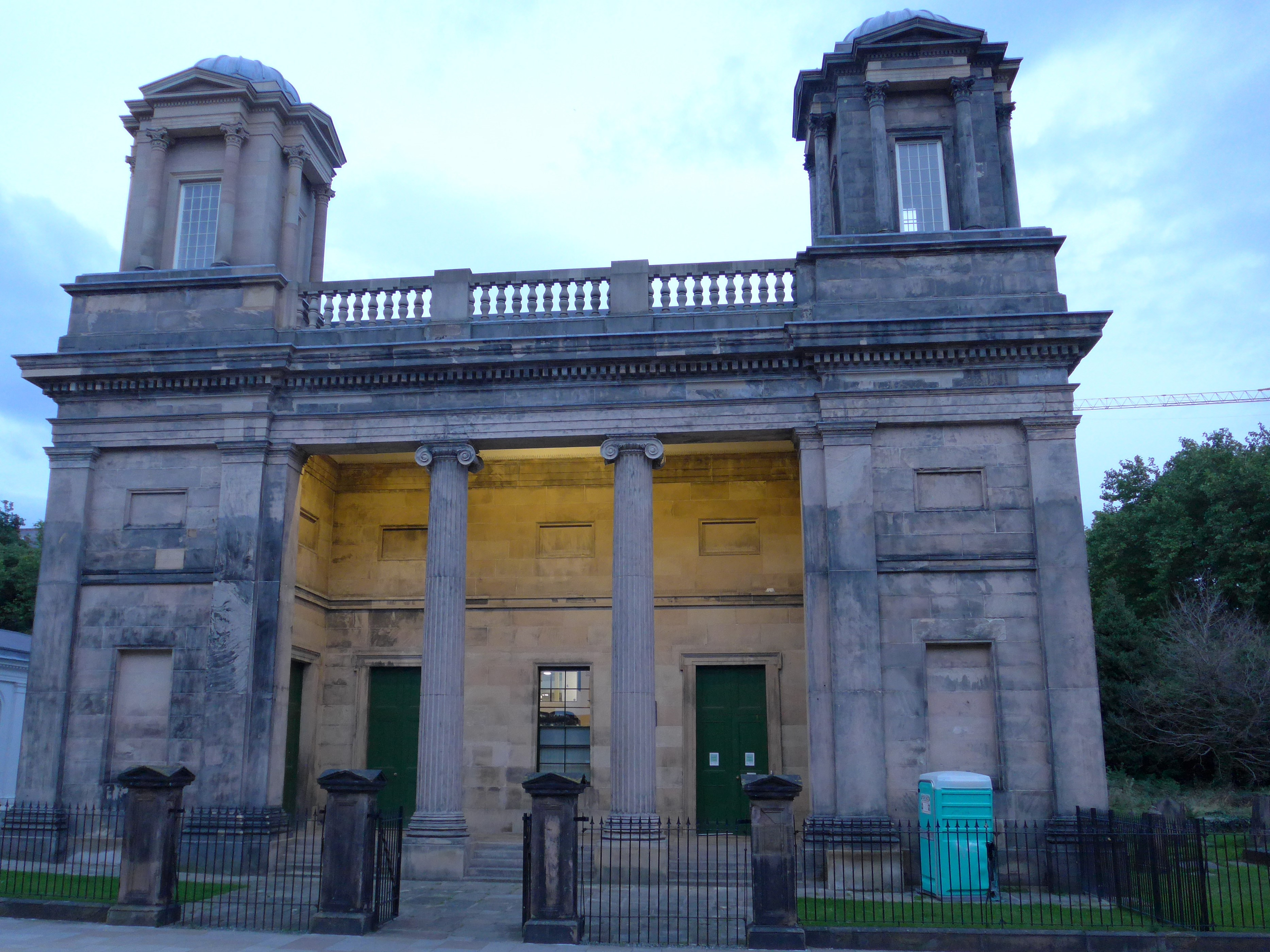
St. Andrew's Church, Rodney Street
(1823–24; Grade II*)

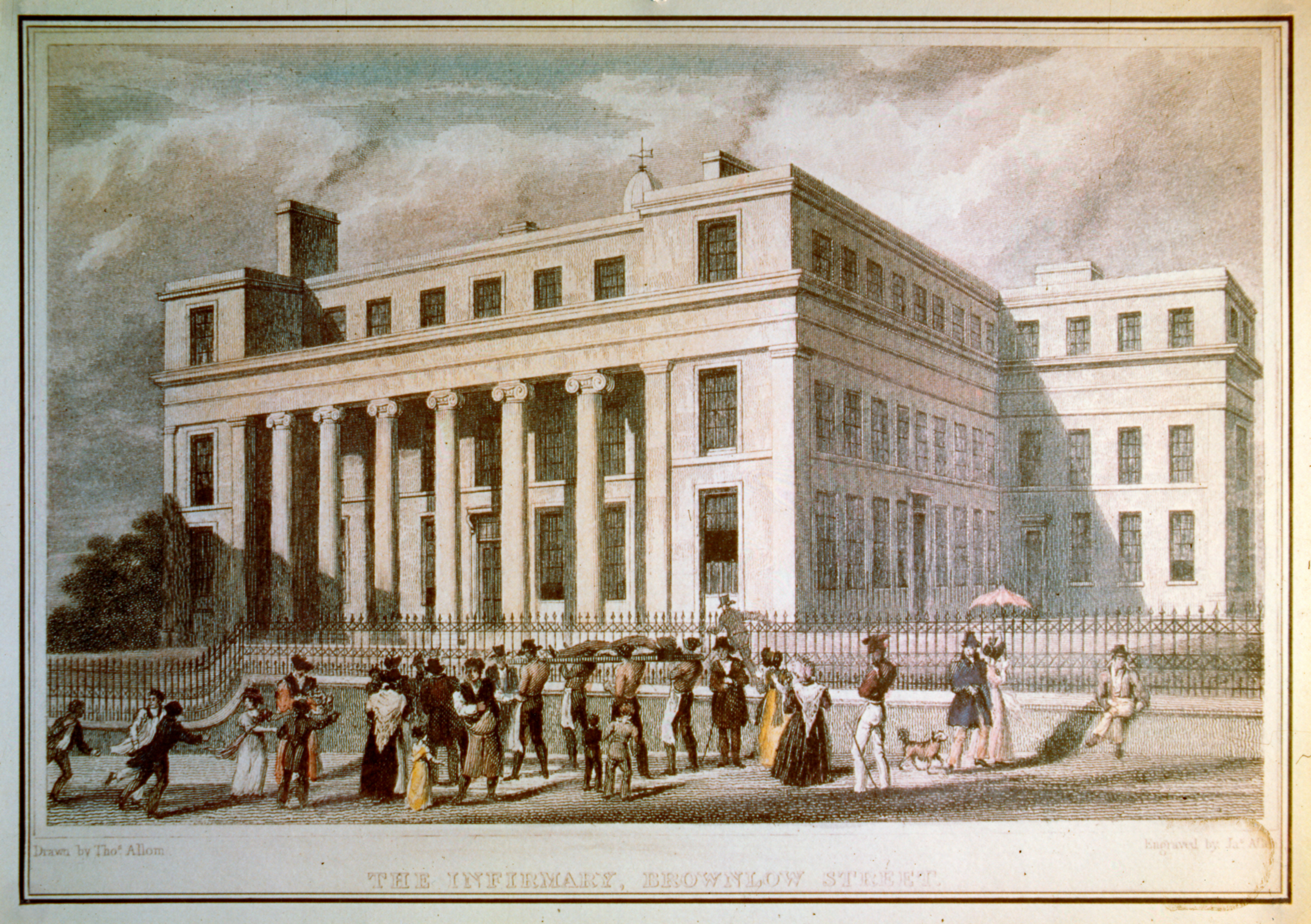
Second Liverpool Royal Infirmary, Brownlow Hill
(1824; demolished 1889)

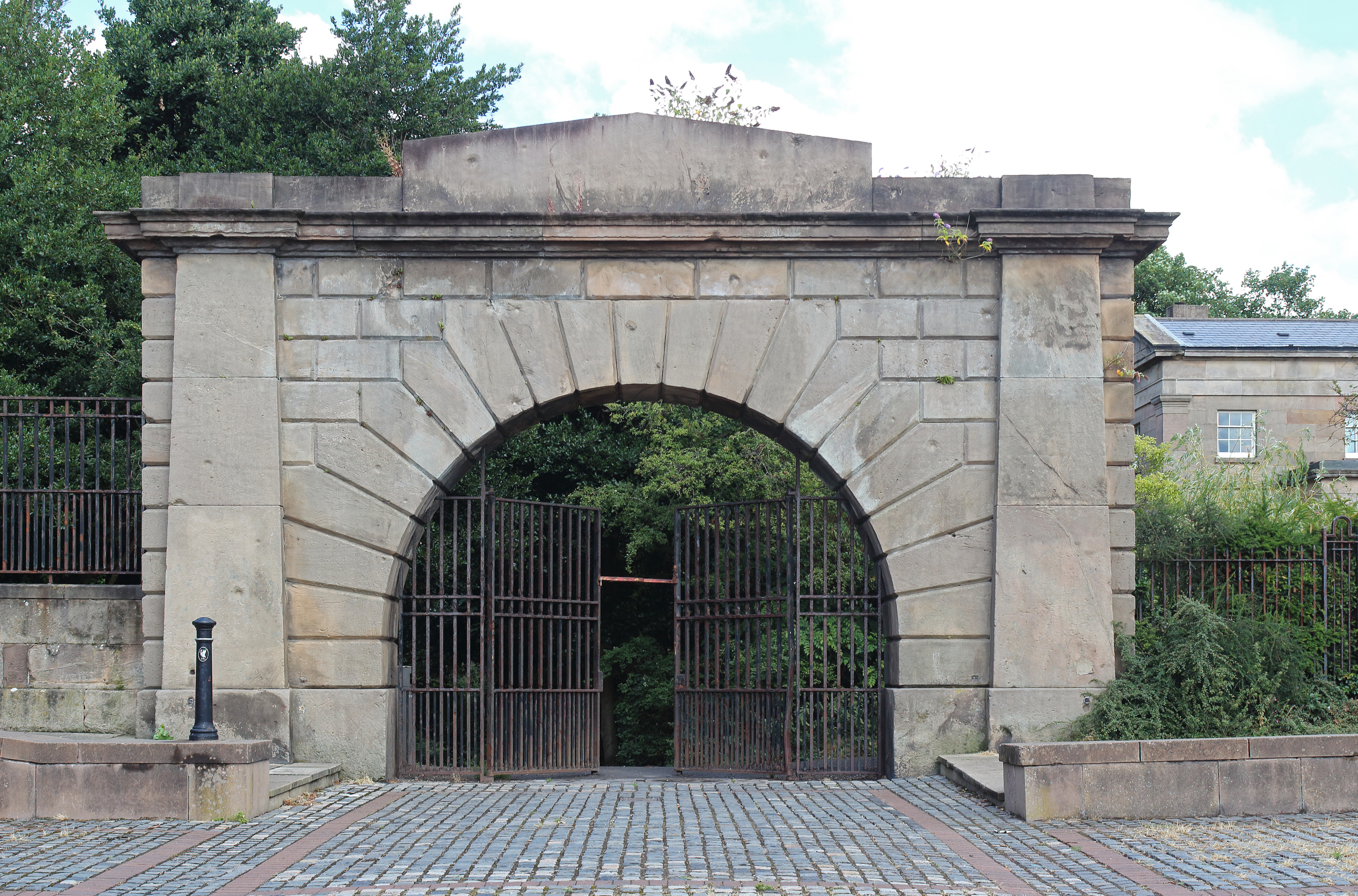
Gateway to St James Cemetery
(1827; Grade II)

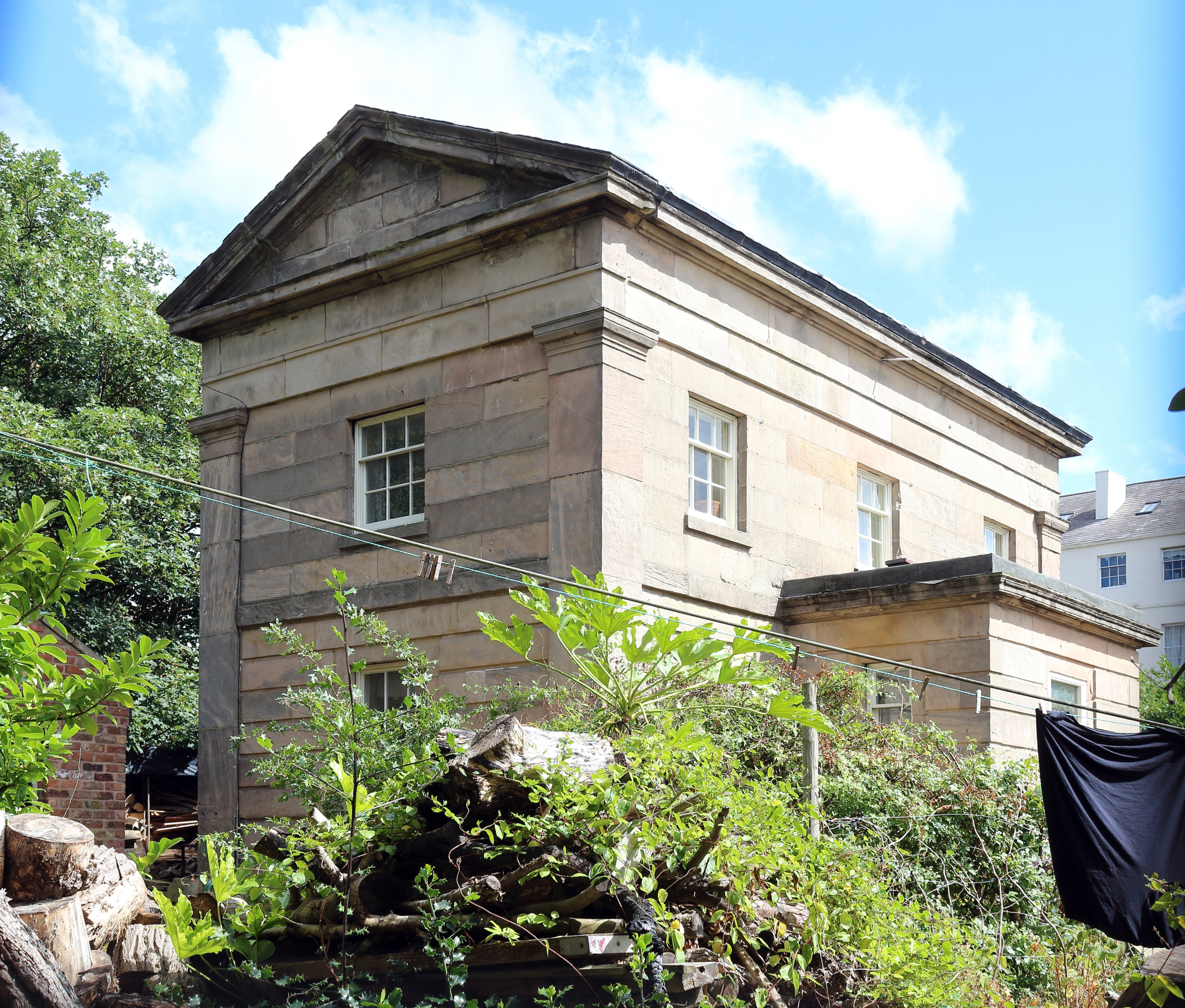
Lodge to St James Cemetery
(c.1828; Grade II)

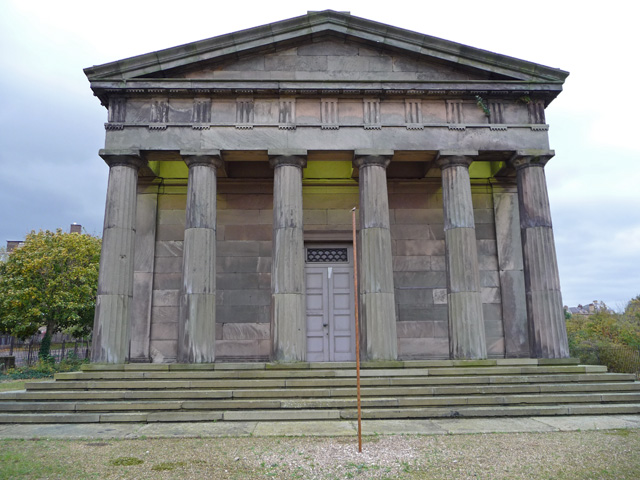
The Oratory, St James Cemetery(1827–29; Grade I)

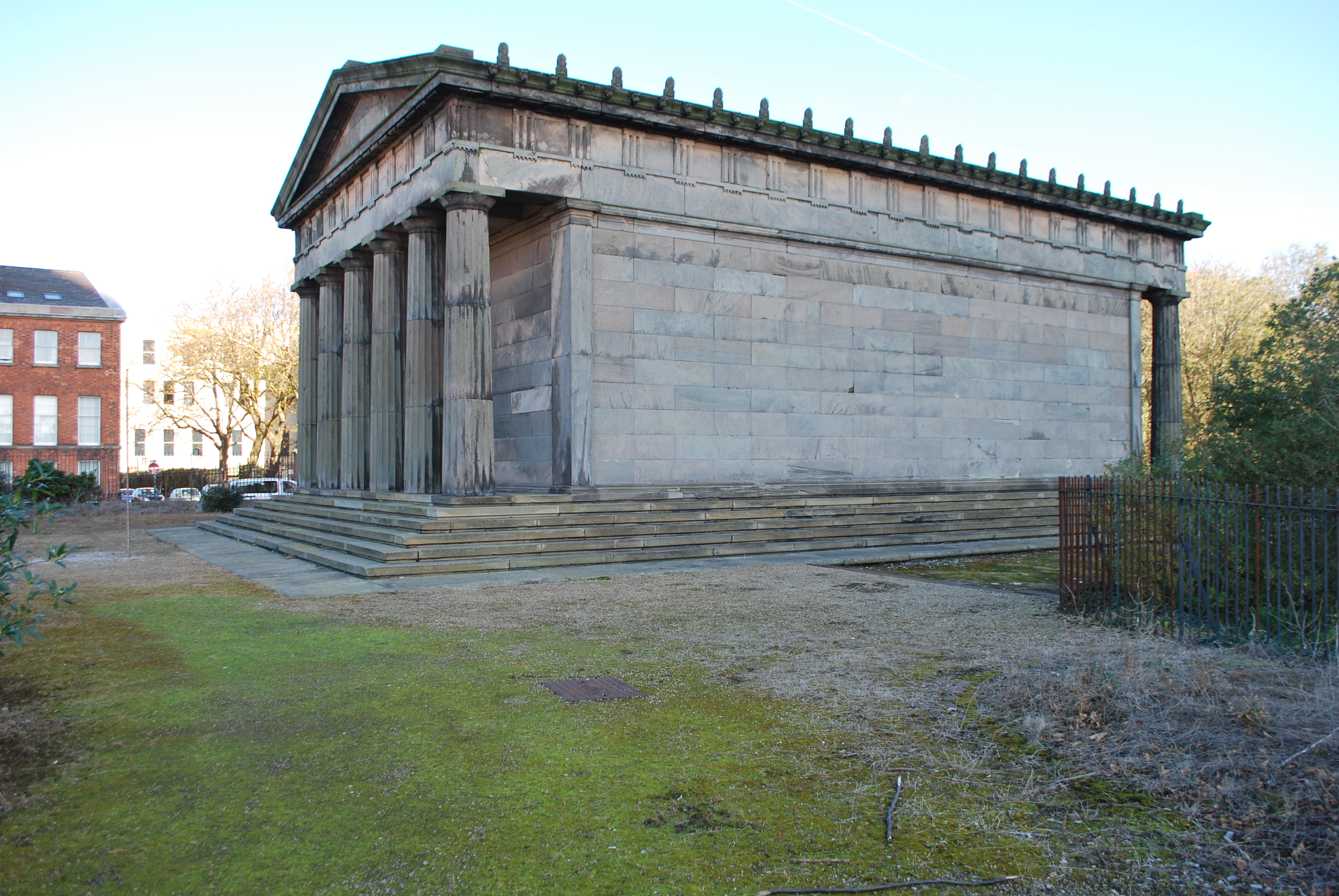
The Oratory, St James Cemetery
(1827–29; Grade I)

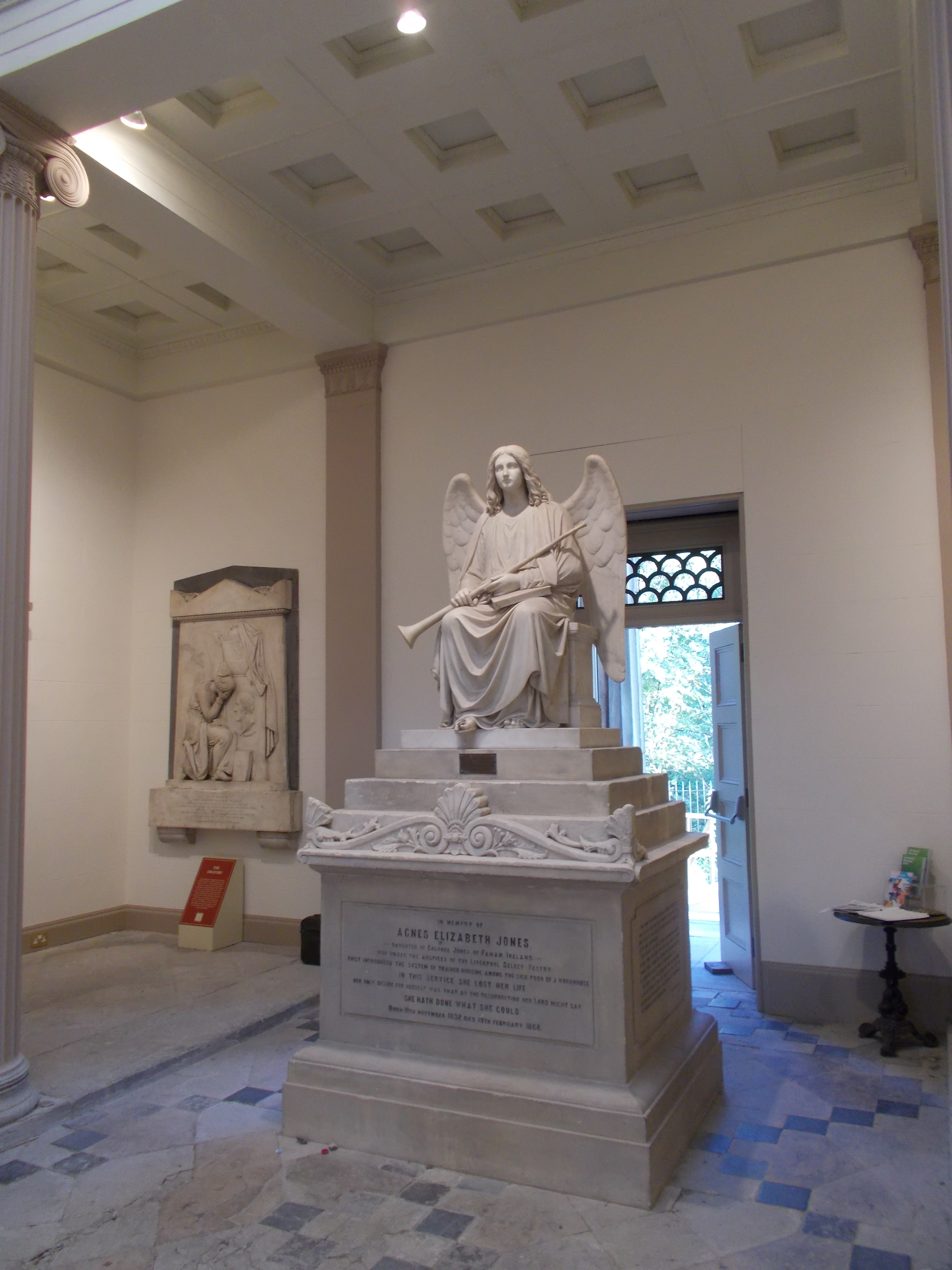
The Interior, The Oratory, St James Cemetery
(1827–29; Grade I)

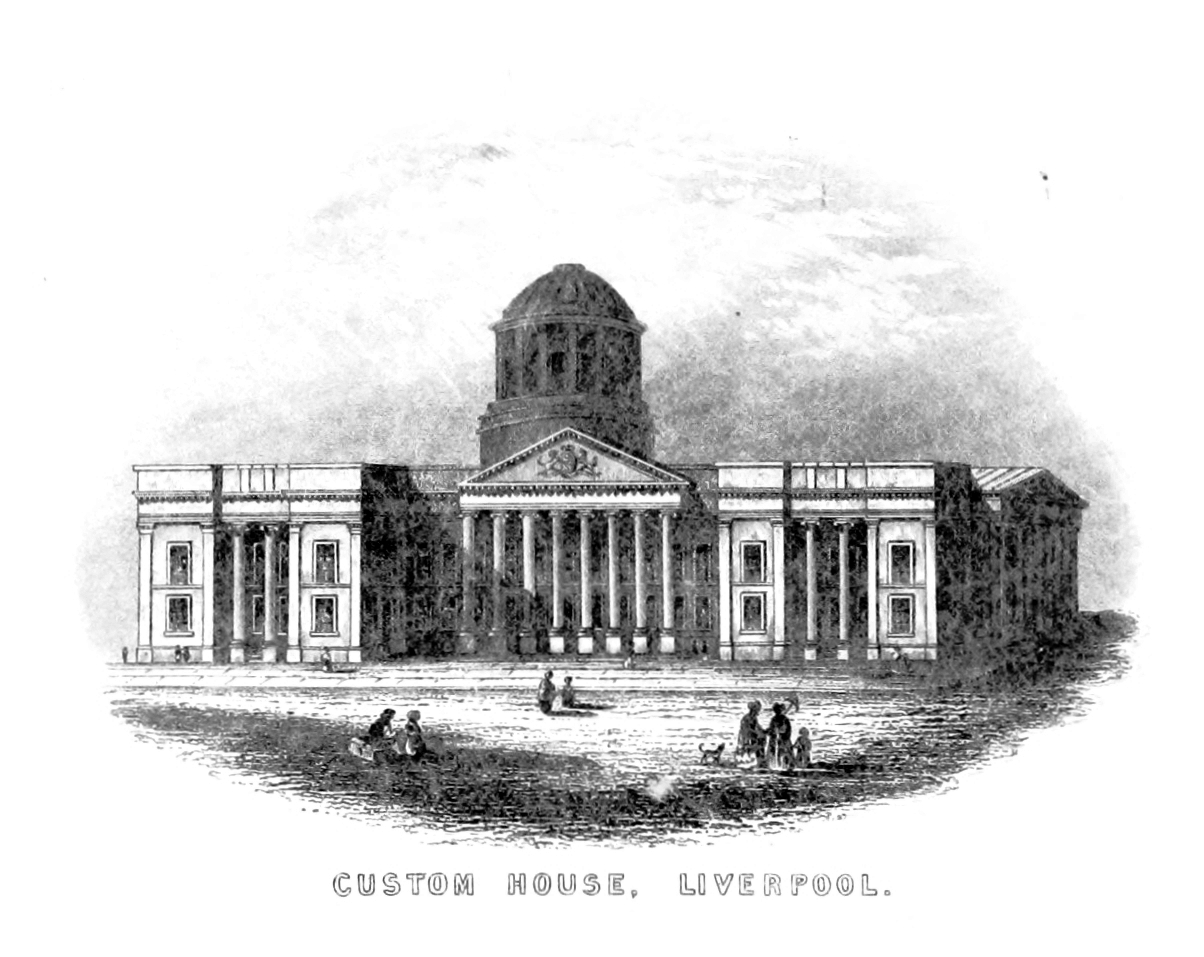
The Custom House (1828–38; bombed 1941, demolished 1946)

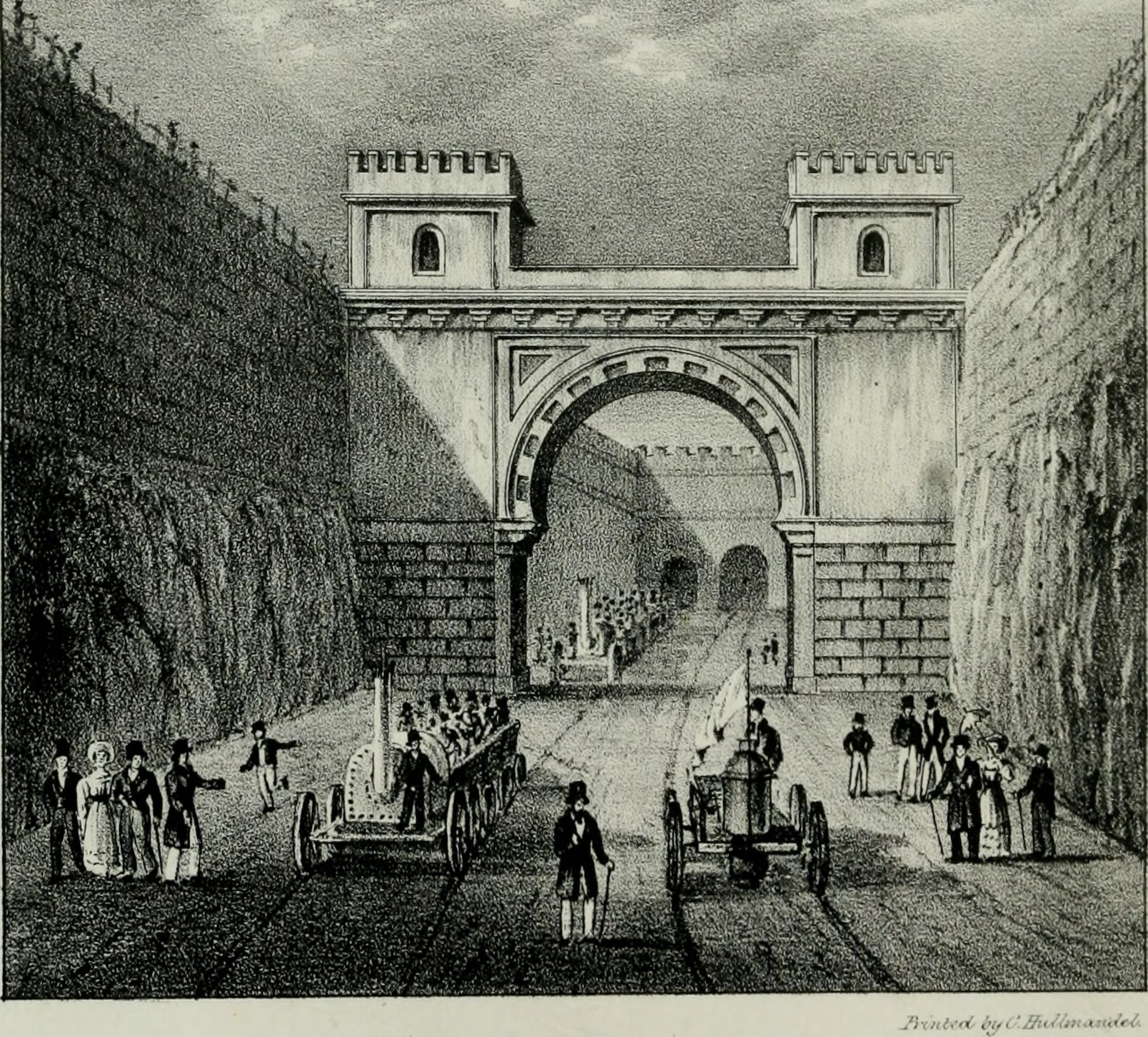
The Moorish Arch, Liverpool and Manchester Railway
(1830; demolished 1860)

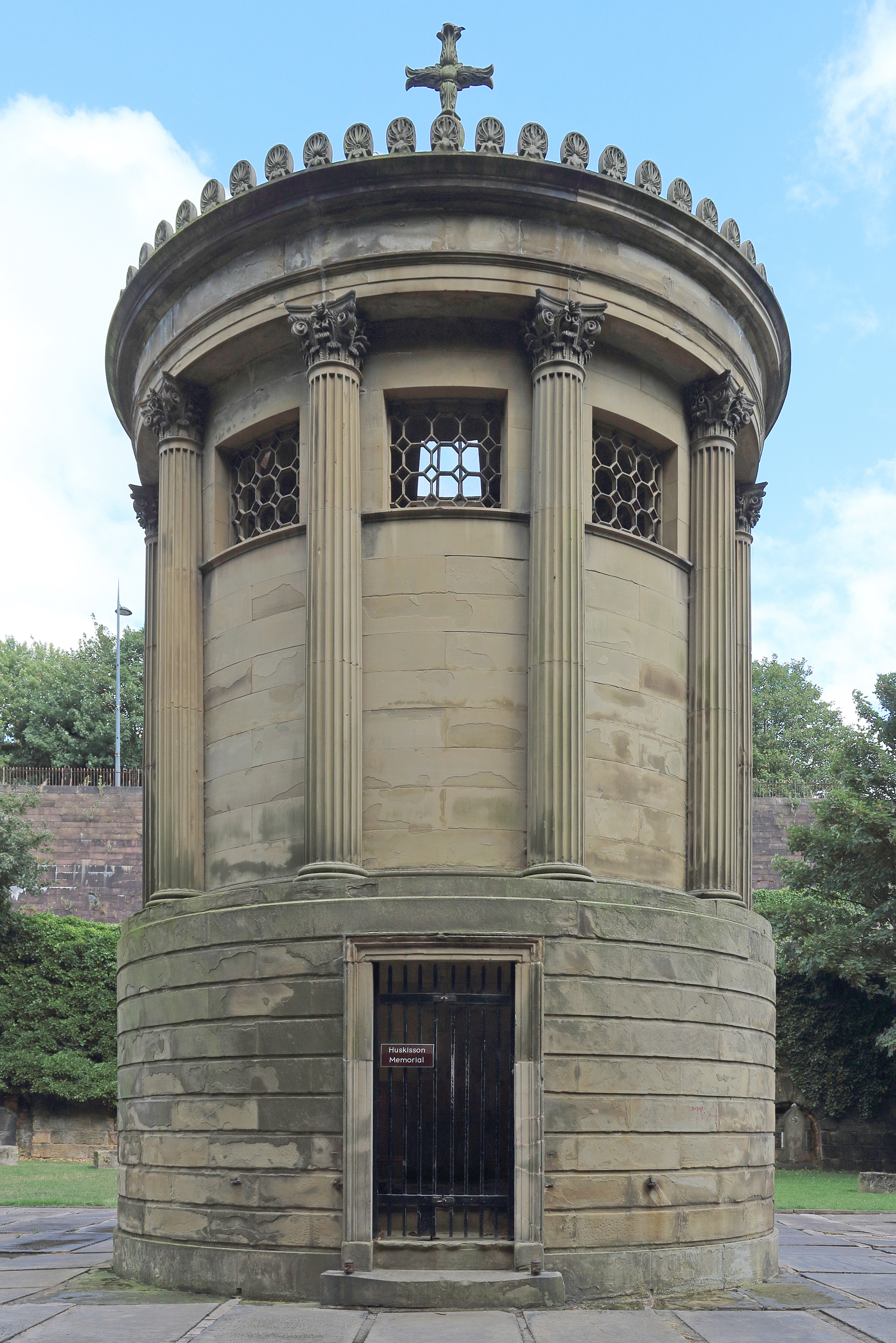
The Huskisson Monument, St James Cemetery
(1834; Grade II)

Preceded by John Foster Sr. (engineer) (1824)	Surveyor to the Corporation of Liverpool; 1824-1835	Succeeded by N/A (abolished)
