= Hanover Chapel, Regent Street =

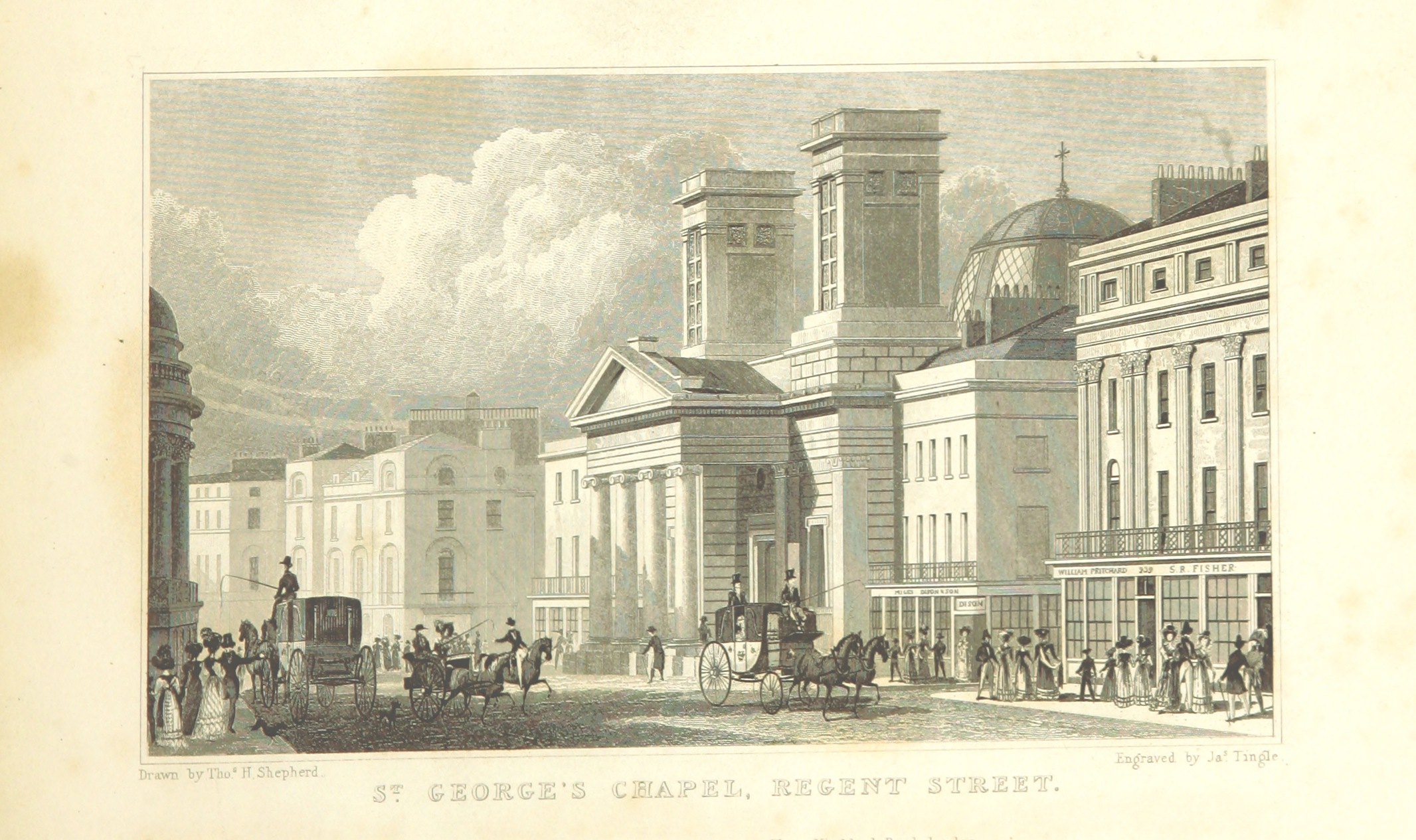
Hanover Chapel, by Thomas H. Shepherd (1828)

Hanover Chapel was a church in Regent Street, London. It was built in 1825, and was demolished in 1896.

== History ==
The building was situated in Regent Street between Hanover Street and Prince's Street. It was designed by Charles Robert Cockerell; the first stone was laid on 6 June 1823, and it was completed in 1825.

William Carnaby was organist from its opening until his death in 1839; in that year Charles Lucas was appointed organist. The incumbent was for many years the Reverend Joseph George Brett (father of William Brett, 1st Viscount Esher).

Edward Walford wrote in 1878: "... it is of the Ionic order, and in its internal arrangement somewhat resembles St Stephen's Church, Walbrook. The altar is enriched with carved work, and the fabric generally forms a fine architectural display, though utterly unsuited to a church."

Hanover Chapel (Regent Street) Act 1891
- Act of Parliament
- Parliament of the United Kingdom
- Long title: An Act to provide for the pulling down of the Parish Church of Hanover Chapel (Regent Street) and building a new Parish Church instead thereof and for other purposes.
- Citation: 54 & 55 Vict. c. cxci

Dates
- Royal assent: 5 August 1891

Text of statute as originally enacted

Parliament passed the Hanover Chapel (Regent Street) Act 1891 (54 & 55 Vict. c. cxci) authorising demolition. It was to be replaced by St Anselm's Church in Davies Street, built in 1894. The chapel was demolished in 1896, and Regent House (a Grade II listed building, at grid reference TQ 29024 81120, coordinates 51°30′51.4″N 0°8′31.2″W) was built on the site. There is a plaque attached to the building on the left of the original entrance door, informing that Hanover Chapel formerly stood on the site. Regent House now contains the London Apple Store.
