= William Carnaby (composer) =

English organist and composer

William Carnaby (1772 – 7 November 1839) was an English organist and composer.

== Life ==
Carnaby was born in London in 1772, and was educated in the Chapel Royal as a chorister under James Nares and Edmund Ayrton. He was subsequently organist at Eye, Suffolk and at Huntingdon. In 1805 he took the degree of Mus. Doc. at Cambridge, where he entered at Trinity Hall. In July 1808 he proceeded Mus. Doc., on which occasion his exercise, described as "a grand musical piece," was performed at Great St Mary's on Sunday 7 July.

Previous to this he had left Huntingdon and settled in London, where he lived at various times at Winchester Row and Red Lion Square. In 1823 he was appointed organist of the newly opened Hanover Chapel, Regent Street, at a salary of £50 per annum, a post he occupied until his death on 7 November 1839.

== Compositions ==
Carnaby wrote many songs: these include six songs dedicated to Lady Templetown; two books of songs dedicated to William Knyvett; six canzonets for two voices to words by William Shenstone; and a collection of vocal music dedicated to Viscountess Mahon. He also composed piano pieces. William Henry Husk wrote that his compositions "have been characterised as scientific, but deficient in taste."
