= Johannes Riepenhausen =

German painter

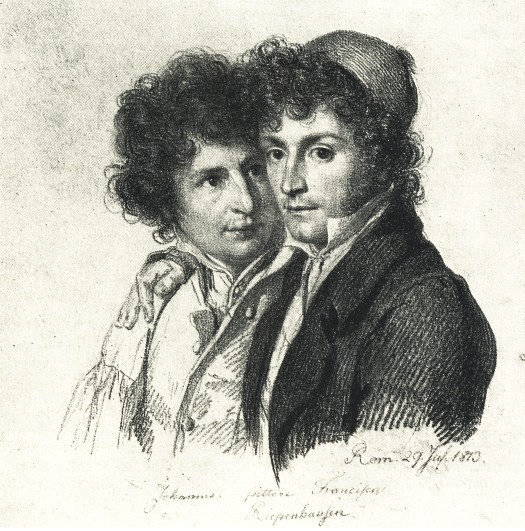
- Johannes (left) and Franz (right) Riepenhausen in an 1813 drawing by Carl Christian Vogel von Vogelstein

Johannes Riepenhausen (1787, Göttingen - 11 September 1860, Rome) and his older brother Franz Riepenhausen (1786, Göttingen - 3 January 1831, Rome) were German painters and engravers who worked in Rome.

== Biography ==
The brothers were sons and pupils of Ernst Ludwig Riepenhausen (1765–1840) who was known through engravings he did of William Hogarth's work. In 1804, the brothers studied under Anton Wilhelm Tischbein at the Academy in Kassel, then in Dresden, and in 1807 went in Tieck's company to Rome, where they settled permanently and devoted themselves chiefly to the study of Raphael's works.

== Collective works ==
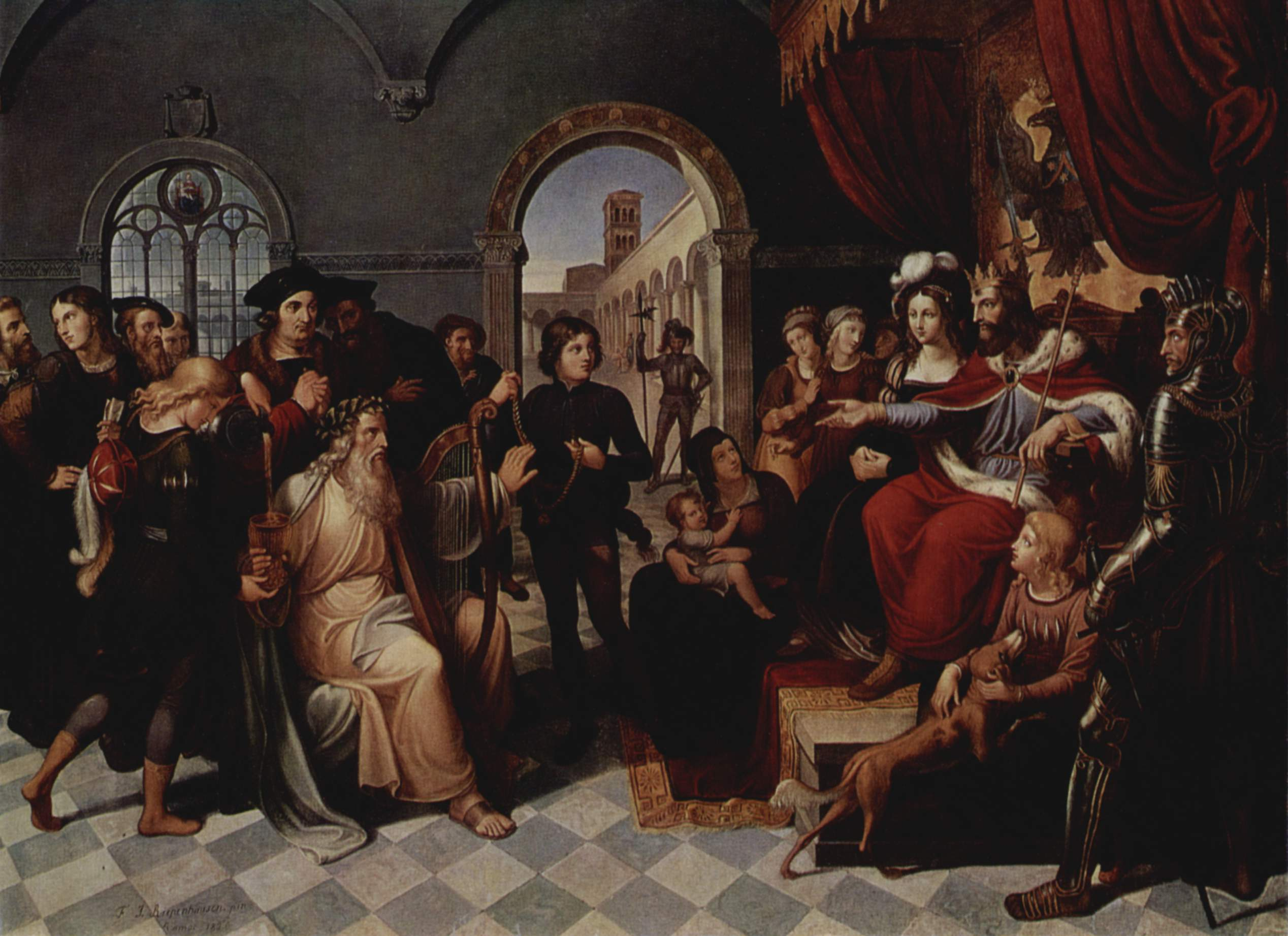
“The Singer”, a collective work

Besides many religious paintings the brothers produced conjointly the “Glorification of Raphael”, and for the Guelph Hall at Hanover “Henry the Lion Protecting Frederick Barbarossa Against the Romans”. They also collaborated in drawings to Goethe's Faust, in episodes from the life of Charlemagne, in 14 etchings, illustrating the Life and Death of Saint Genevieve (1806), a Geschichte der Malerei in Italien (History of painting in Italy), with 24 outline drawings after Italian masters before Perugino (1810), and a series of drawings after the paintings of Polygnotus at Delphi, according to Pausanias.

== Johannes' solo works ==
After the death of Franz, Johannes published a Vita di Raffaello in 14 plates, for which the brothers had composed drawings together, and also executed several large paintings such as “Raphael's Death” (1836), “Destruction of the Cenci Family” (1839), and others.
