= Peter Oluf Brøndsted =

Danish archaeologist (1780–1842)

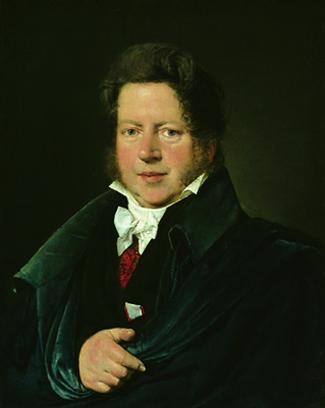
- Portrait by Christian Albrecht Jensen
- Born: November 17, 1780
- Died: June 26, 1842 (aged 61)
- Occupations: Archeologist; professor
- Spouse: Frederikke Koës
- Children: 3

Academic background
- Education: University of Copenhagen

Academic work
- Era: Ancient Greece
- Discipline: Archeology
- Institutions: University of Copenhagen
- Notable works: Travels and Archaeological Researches in Greece

Peter Oluf Brøndsted (17 November 1780 – 26 June 1842) was a Danish archaeologist. He was a professor and rector at the University of Copenhagen. Brøndsted was the first Danish scholar who was involved in archeological work in Greece.

== Biography ==
Brøndsted was born on 16 November 1780 at Fruering in Jutland to Lutheran minister Christian Brøndsted and Mette Augusta Pedersen. He attended Horsens Latin School whose principal Olaf Worm was an important influence on his interests. He began to study theology at the University of Copenhagen but later turned to philology.

== Career ==
After studying at the University of Copenhagen, he visited Paris in 1806 with philologist Georg Koës (1782–1811). After remaining there two years, they went together to Italy. In 1810, they joined an expedition to Greece with archaeologists Otto Magnus von Stackelberg (1787-1837) and Carl Haller von Hallerstein (1774–1817), German painter Jakob Linckh (1787–1841) and the then Austrian consul in Greece, George Christian Gropius (1776–1850). Unexpectedly, the following year, Koës died on Zante at the age of 29 of pneumonia. The group went its separate ways in order to carry out excavations at different places. While one group uncovered the Temple of Zeus on Aegina and the temple of Apollo at Bassae in Arcadia, Brøndsted and Linckh in the winter of 1811/12 led the excavations of the shrine of Apollo at Karthaia on Kea.

After three years of active researches in Greece, Brøndsted returned to Copenhagen in 1813, where he was appointed extraordinary professor of Greek and philology at University of Copenhagen. During these years, Brøndsted gathered and organized the notes and materials he had brought out of Greece. His lectures awakened great interest in many students.

As he began to arrange and prepare for publication the vast materials he had collected during his travels, he found that Copenhagen did not afford him the desired facilities. Following the death of his wife in 1818, he exchanged his professorship for the office of Danish ambassador in the Papal State and took up residence in Rome. In 1820 and 1821 he visited Sicily and the Ionian Islands to collect additional materials.

In 1826 he went to London, chiefly with a view to studying the Elgin Marbles and other remains of antiquity in the British Museum, and became acquainted with the principal archaeologists of England. From 1828 to 1832 he resided in Paris, to superintend the publication of his Travels, and then returned to Copenhagen on being appointed director of the Royal Collection of Coins and Medals (Den Kongelige Mønt- og Medaillesamling). In 1842 he became rector of the University of Copenhagen but a fall from his horse caused his death in June.

== Principal works ==
His principal work was the Travels and Archaeological Researches in Greece (in German and French, 1826–1830), of which only two volumes were published, dealing with the island of Ceos and the metopes of the Parthenon. His two principal publications in English are, A brief description of thirty-two painted Greek vases found near Vulci, (London, 1832) and, The bronzes of Siris, (London, 1836).

== Personal life ==
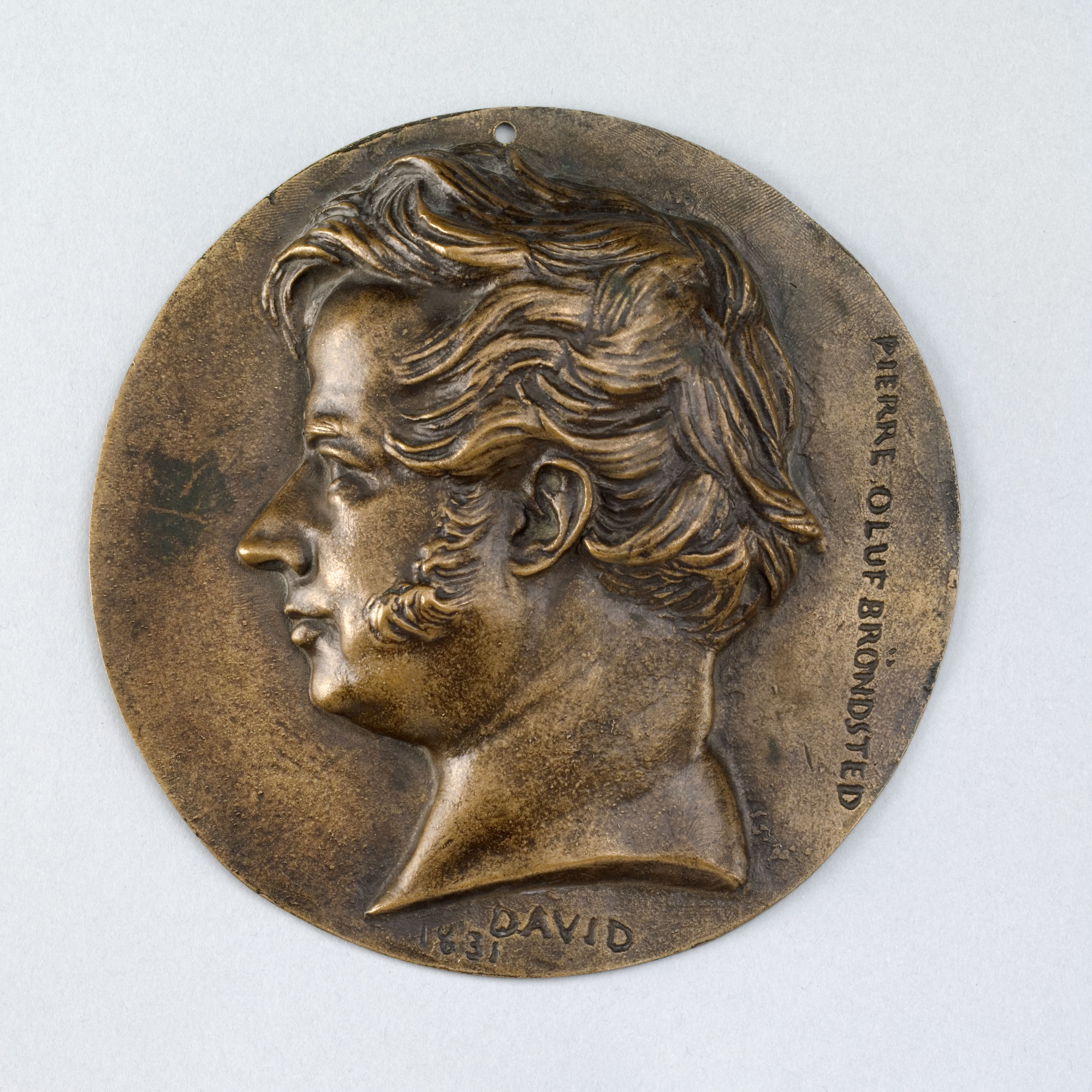
Medal commemorating Brøndsted.

In 1813, he married Frederikke Koës, sister of Georg Koës, who died in 1818 after the birth of their third child.

Brøndsted was created a Knight of the Order of the Dannebrog in 1815 and a Commander of the Order of the Dannebrog in 1840. He was awarded the Cross of Honour in 1826.

He died during 1842 and was buried in Assistens Cemetery. The street Brøndsteds Allé in Frederiksberg is named after him.

His son Georg Koës Brøndsted owned Gyldenholm Manor at Slagelse. His daughter Frederikke Köes Brøndsted was married to Michael Treschow. His daughter Augusta Marie Frederikke Brøndsted was married to the politician Carl Christian Hall.

A selection of his letters, dating from 1801–33, has been published as Breve fra P.O. Brøndsted (Memoirer og Breve, Claussen and Rist, 1926).

Academic offices
Preceded by Hans Christian Ørsted	Rector of University of Copenhagen; 1841-1842	Succeeded by Carl Emil Scharling
