= Georg Koës =

Danish philologist

Georg Koës

Georg Hendrick Carl Koës (1782–1811) was a Danish philologist of the early 19th century.

Koës was born in Antvorskov, the third son of Anna Mathea Falch and Georg Frederik Koës, and was christened on 4 February 1782 in St Peter's, Slagelse.

He studied classical philology under F.A. Wolf at the University of Halle, writing pioneering works of textual criticism on ancient Greek works, including Homer, whose work he demonstrated to be by more than one writer (Specimen observationum in Odysseam criticarum, acc. commentatio de discrepantiis quibusdam in Odyssea occurrentibus, Copenhagen 1806). He visited Paris in 1806 with his friend Peter Oluf Brøndsted. After remaining there two years, they went together to Italy. Both were zealously attached to the study of antiquities and the tastes and interests they held in common led them, in 1810, to join an expedition to Greece with Otto Magnus von Stackelberg, Carl Haller von Hallerstein, the German painter Jakob Linckh, and the then Austrian consul in Greece George Christian Gropius.

== Death ==
Gell's drawing of the grave

However, Koës died unexpectedly on Zante in 1811, aged 29, of pneumonia. He was buried at the house of consul Lunzi on the island (Brøndsted was away in Thessaly at the time). Sir William Gell, who also participated in the expedition, sent home a drawing of the burial-spot for Koës's family back in Denmark, and this is now in the possession of the Brøndsted family.

The expedition continued and, when Brøndsted returned to Copenhagen in 1813, he married Georg's sister Frederikke. Koes had been engaged to his cousin Caroline Falch (7 November 1790 – 10 November 1856), daughter of Andreas Falch (1748–1797) and Charlotte Sophie Suhr (1756–1822), before leaving for Paris, and on his death she married Theodor Suhr the elder (1792–1858) around 1816.
