= Anne Margiste =

Estonian actress

- Born: Anne-Reet Margiste; 3 August 1942 (age 83); Vääna, Harku Parish, Harju County, Estonia
- Other name: Anne-Reet Margiste
- Occupation: Actress
- Years active: 1964 – present
- Spouse: Arved Haug (1979 – 1995, his death)

Anne Margiste (often credited as Anne-Reet Margiste; born 3 August 1942) is an Estonian stage, film, and television actress whose career began in the mid-1960s.

== Early life and education ==
Anne-Reet Margiste was born in Vääna, the only child of Vootele Margiste and Vanda-Dagmar Margiste (née Altberg). She attended primary and secondary schools in Tallinn, graduating from Tallinn Secondary School No. 7 (now, Tallinn English College) in 1960. Afterward, she studied acting at the Viktor Kingissepp Tallinn State Academic Drama Theatre in Tallinn (now, the Estonian Drama Theatre), graduating in 1965. Margiste also attended the University of Tartu, majoring in the Estonian language, graduating in 1970.

== Career ==
=== Stage ===
From 1965 until 1973, Anne Margiste was engaged as an actress at the Rakvere Theatre in Rakvere. Her first major role was that of Miranda in a 1966 production of Max Frisch's Don Juan or The Love of Geometry. Margiste left the Rakvere Theatre in 1973 to join the Ugala Theatre in Viljandi, where she was engaged until 2005.

During her long stage career, she has appeared in productions in works by such varied international playwrights and authors as: Eduardo De Filippo, Ray Lawler, Anton Chekhov, Lope de Vega, William Shakespeare, Fyodor Dostoyevsky, Molière, Lion Feuchtwanger, George Bernard Shaw, Truman Capote, Oscar Wilde, Tennessee Williams, Frank Marcus, Isaac Babel, Leo Tolstoy, Alexander Ostrovsky, Friedrich von Schiller, Mark Twain, J. B. Priestley, Eino Leino, and Isaac Bashevis Singer. She also appeared in many productions in works by Estonian playwrights and authors, most memorably in productions of works by: A. H. Tammsaare, Oskar Luts, Hella Wuolijoki, Juhan Smuul, August Gailit, Jaan Kruusvall, Aino Kallas, Jaan Oksa and Ingomar Vihmari.

=== Film and television and voice ===
Anne Margiste has also appeared in several Estonian films. Her first role was in the 1991 Jüri Sillart directed drama Noorelt õpitud for Tallinnfilm. This was followed by appearances in three short films; Hüvasti igaveseks, värdjad! in 2003, and Hirm and Sügise palett in 2010. In 2015, Margiste had a small role in the Elmo Nüganen directed war-drama 1944 for Taska Film.

In addition to her work on the stage and film, Margiste has appeared in several television series. Most notably, in the Kanal 2 crime series Kelgukoerad, the long-running Eesti Televisioon (ETV) drama serial Õnne 13, the Kanal 2 crime series Siberi võmm, the Kanal 2 drama series Saladused, and most recently, in the TV3 comedy-crime series Kättemaksukontor in 2017 as the character Marta Suvi.

Margiste has also recorded a large number of audio books from several authors for the Estonian Library for the Blind.

== Personal life ==
Anne Margiste met composer, musician and singer Arved Haug in 1969 and the two began a relationship shortly after. The couple married in 1979 and remained married until Haug's death in 1995. Margiste never had children. She currently resides in Tallinn.

== Awards and recognition ==
Anne Margiste was awarded the Artist of the Estonian SSR in 1986. She is an Honorary Member of the Estonian Association of Actors.
