= Carl Haller von Hallerstein =

German architect and archaeologist (1774–1817)

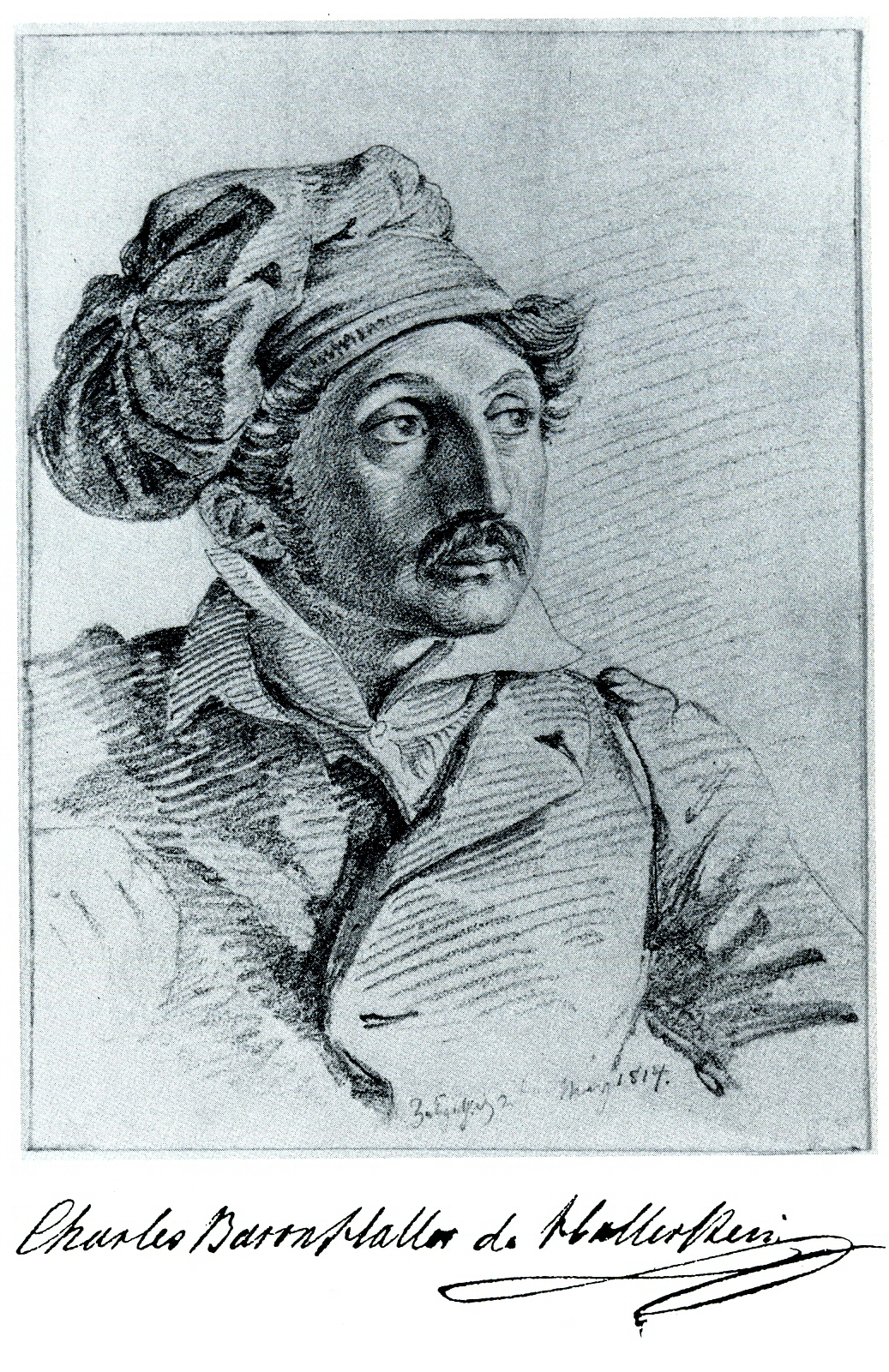
Haller von Hallerstein by Otto Magnus von Stackelberg, 1814

Johann Carl Christoph Wilhelm Joachim Haller von Hallerstein (10 June 1774, Burg Hilpoltstein, Hiltpoltstein, Principality of Bayreuth – 5 November 1817, Ampelakia, Thessaly, Ottoman Greece) was a German architect, archaeologist and art historian.

He is best known for his role in the 1811–1812 excavations at the Temple of Aphaia on Aegina and the Temple of Apollo Epicurius at Bassae, where he worked alongside Charles Robert Cockerell, John Foster Jr. and others. The group removed the Aphaia pedimental sculptures and the Bassae frieze, which were clandestinely exported and later sold. Modern and contemporary accounts describe the removals as acts of antiquities smuggling and plunder. The Aphaia marbles were acquired by Crown Prince Ludwig of Bavaria for the Glyptothek in Munich, and in 1815 the British Museum purchased the Bassae frieze at a London auction from Haller von Hallerstein and his associates.

== Biography ==
He was born into a famous Nuremberg noble patrician family, as son of Freiherr (Baron) Karl Joachim Haller von Hallerstein and Sophie Amalie von Imhof. Hallerstein studied architecture at the Carlsakademie in Stuttgart and then at the Berliner Bauakademie under David Gilly. He was then engaged in 1806 as a royal building inspector in Nuremberg.

He visited Rome in 1808 to study its early Christian architecture. In June 1810 he accompanied Jakob Linkh (1786–1841), Peter Oluf Brøndsted (1780–1842), Otto Magnus von Stackelberg (1787–1837) and Georg Koës (1782–1811) to Athens, via Naples, Corfu and Corinth. In 1811, in Athens, he met the English architects Charles Robert Cockerell and John Foster (1786–1846), with whom he studied Athens's ancient buildings.

In 1811, he, Linkh and von Stackelberg discovered the temple of Aphaia on the island of Aegina, a part of whose sculptures are in the Munich Glyptothek as a result. In the same year, von Hallerstein (with Cockerell, Gropius, Linckh, Stackelberg, Bröndsted and Foster) excavated the ruins of the temple of Apollo in Bassae, whose relief frieze was taken to the British Museum by Cockerell. Sadly Haller's drawings were lost at sea. Later he led yet more excavations on Ithaka and in the ruins of the theatre on Milos.

Haller died in Thessaly in 1817 after catching a fever. He was temporarily buried there but then later moved to Athens.

== Sources ==
- Klaus Frässle: Carl Haller von Hallerstein (1774-1817). Freiburg i.Br.: Univ., Philosoph. Fak., Dissertation 1971.
- Hansgeorg Bankel: Und die Erde gebar ein Lächeln: der erste deutsche Archäologe in Griechenland Carl Haller von Hallerstein 1774 - 1817. München: Süddeutscher Verlag, 1983. ISBN 3-7991-6181-3.
- Hansgeorg Bankel: Carl Haller von Hallerstein in Griechenland 1810 - 1817: Architekt, Zeichner, Bauforscher (anlässl. d. Ausstellung Carl Haller von Hallerstein in Griechenland 1810 - 1817: München, Palais Preysing, 14. Februar - 15. März 1986; Nürnberg, Albrecht-Dürerhaus u. Fembohaus, 22. März - 11. Mai 1986; Berlin-Charlottenburg, Antikenmuseum SMPK, 14. Juni - 31. August 1986). Im Auftr. d. Carl-Haller-von-Hallerstein-Ges. hrsg. von Hansgeorg Bankel. Berlin: Reimer, 1986. ISBN 3-496-00840-7
- R. Lullies, W. Schiering (eds.): Archäologenbildnisse: Porträts und Kurzbiographien von Klassischen Archäologen deutscher Sprache. Deutsches Archäologisches Institut. Mainz: von Zabern, 1988: 16–17. ISBN 3-8053-0971-6
