= Ernst-Ludwig Schwandner =

German architectural historian (1938–2021)

Ernst-Ludwig Schwandner (2 June 1938 Berlin - 11 August 2021 Stahnsdorf) was a German architectural historian and classical archaeologist.

Schwandner received his doctorate in 1975 from the Technischen Universität München (Germany) with a thesis on the older temple of Aphaia on Aegina (German title: Der Ältere Tempel der Aphaia auf Aegina) under the supervision of Gottfried Gruben. Until his retirement in 2004, Schwandner held the post of director in the architecture department of the German Archaeological Institute (federal German archeological survey) in Berlin. In 2002 he joined the faculty at the Winkelmann Institute of the Humboldt University Berlin as adjunct professor ("Honorarprofessor"). Schwandner's research primarily focused on the architectural history of ancient Greek architecture.

== Publications ==
- Der Ältere Tempel der Aphaia auf Aegina. (unpublished dissertation), Technische Universität, Munich 1977;
- Der ältere Porostempel der Aphaia auf Aegina. Denkmäler antiker Architektur 16, ISBN 3-11-010279-X;
- Akarnanien, die unbekannte Landschaft Griechenlands. Feldforschungen in Stratos und Palairos. Nürnberger Blätter zur Archäologie 17 (2000–01): 8-22.
