= Otto Magnus von Stackelberg (archaeologist) =

Russian archeologist (1786–1837)

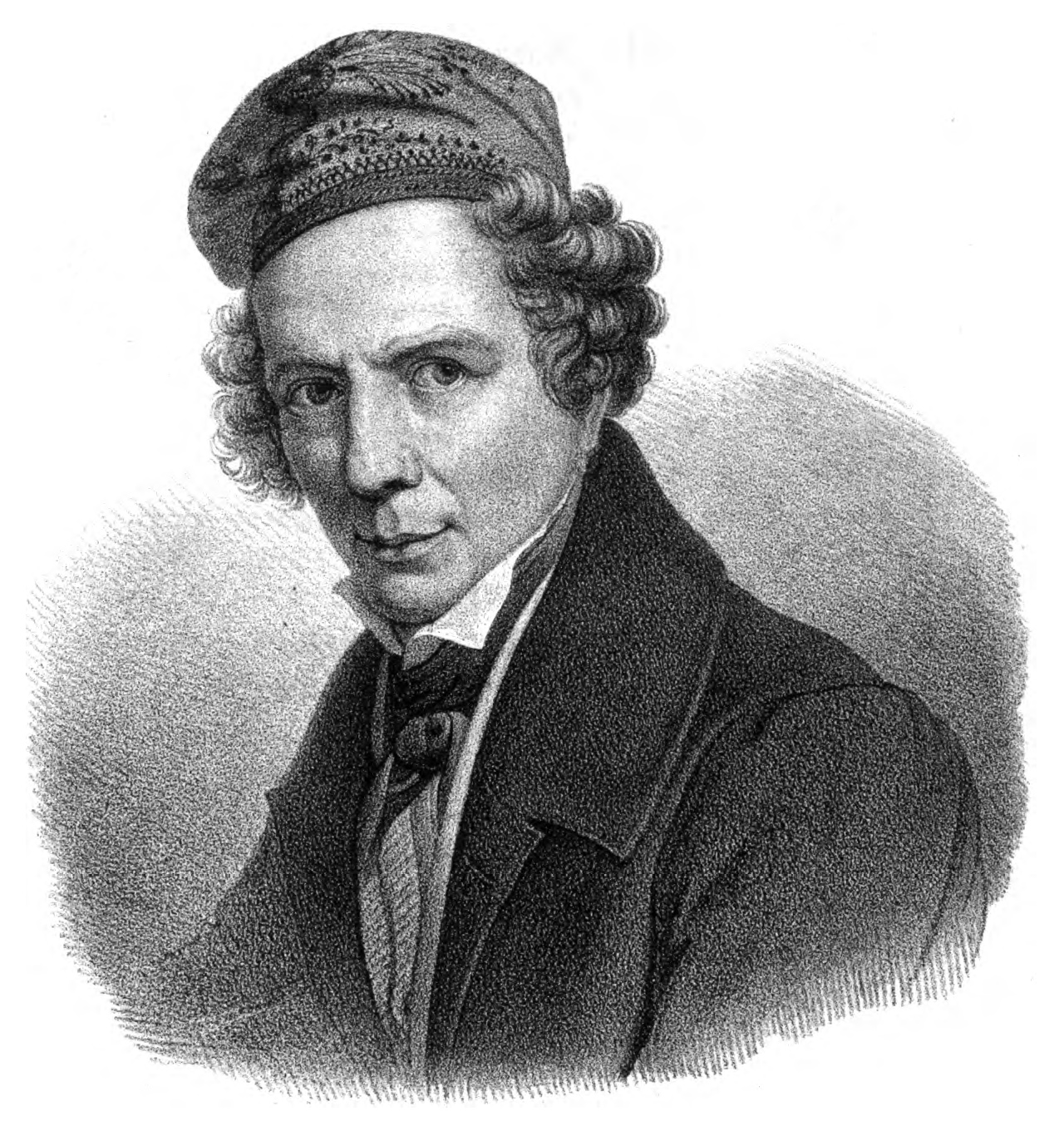
- Otto Magnus von Stackelberg
- Born: 25 July 1786; Reval, Governorate of Estonia, Russian Empire
- Died: 27 March 1837 (aged 50); St. Petersburg, Russian Empire
- Occupations: Classicist; archaeologist; art historian; writer; artist
- Writing career
- Period: 1825–1837
- Subjects: Art history and archaeology of ancient Greece and Rome
- Movement: Classicism

Otto Magnus Freiherr von Stackelberg (Russian: Отто Магнус фон Штакельберг, romanized: Otto Magnus fon Shtakelberg; 25 July 1786 – 27 March 1837) was a Russian archaeologist, writer, painter and art historian of Baltic German descent.

== Life ==
=== Early life ===
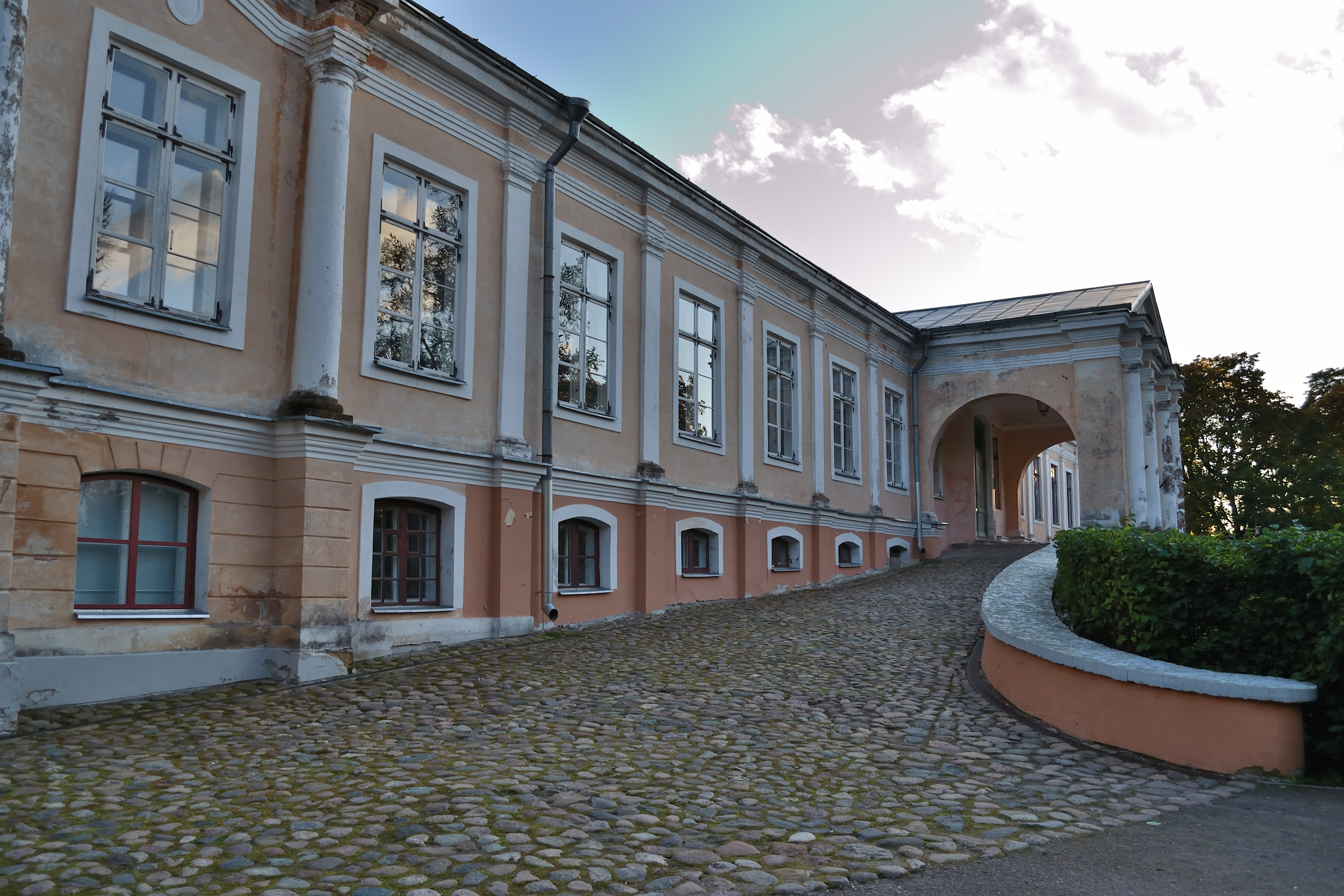
Fähna (Vääna) manor, Estonia, where von Stackelberg spent his youth

He was born in Reval (Tallinn), Estonia to Otto Christian Engelbrecht von Stackelberg and Anna Gertruda Düker. His father, an Oberst (Colonel) in the Russian Imperial corps, died six years later in 1792. The young Otto showed an early predilection for music, unlike his brothers, who like many young men at the time were mainly interested in riding, fighting and hunting. His mother, recognising talent in his early drawings, arranged for the German painter Reus to come to the family estate at Fähna (Vääna) to act as Otto's tutor.

Originally destined for the diplomatic corps, he began his studies at the University of Göttingen in 1803. Later that same year he travelled to Zurich with two of his brothers, a journey that was to have a great impact on his life. There he saw pictures by Johann Caspar Lavater and Salomon Geßner and visited Johann Heinrich Pestalozzi. After wintering in Geneva he continued with his brother Karl to Italy, where the initial thoughts he had had at Zurich of devoting his life to the arts flourished. A stay in Dresden to study painting followed in 1804 but the following year he continued his diplomatic studies in Moscow. By now his mother had realized that her son was not suited for the diplomatic service and from then on Stackelberg dedicated himself to art and increasingly to archaeology.

=== First trip to Greece ===
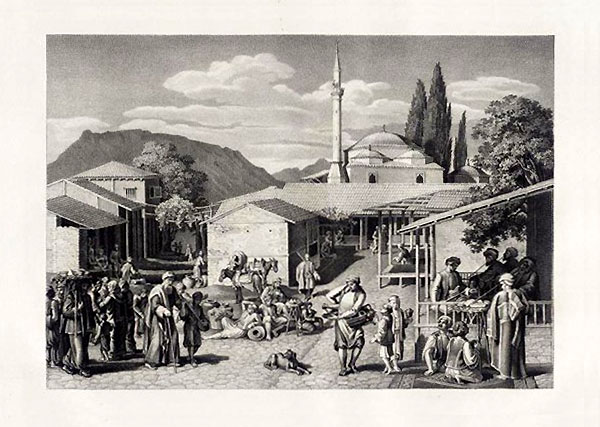
Image from his "Trachten und Gebräuche der Neugriechen"

A second period of study at Göttingen followed, along with (between 1806 and 1808) time at a gallery at Dresden. In autumn 1808, he set out on a second Italian trip, this time accompanied by Ernst Heinrich Tölken. On their way to Italy, they encountered Jean Paul in Bayreuth and visited the gallery at Schleissheim Palace near Munich. They reached Rome in 1809 and there met and became friends with the archaeologist and art historian Carl Haller von Hallerstein, the Danish archaeologists and philologists Peter Oluf Brondsted and Georg Koës, the German painter Jakob Linckh, and the then Austrian consul in Greece George Christian Gropius. Bröndsted and Koës persuaded Stackelberg to accompany them on their trip to Greece. They intended to produce an archaeological publication upon their return, for which Stackelberg would produce landscapes.

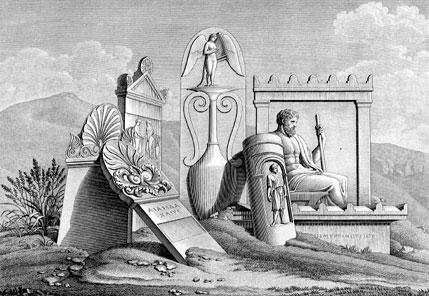
Another of his engravings

The trip to Greece was long and adventurous, setting out from Naples in July 1810 and not arriving in the Piraeus until September. At Athens, they were joined by the British architects and archaeologists John Foster and Charles Robert Cockerell. The group carried out excavations at several Greek sites – in 1811 at the Temple of Aphaia at Aegina, they removed the fallen fragmentary pediment sculptures and on von Hallerstein's recommendation shipped them abroad and sold them the following year to Crown Prince Ludwig of Bavaria; and in 1812 they exposed parts of the temple of Apollo at Bassae (the frieze they found on it is now in the British Museum) and Aeacus's temple of Zeus Panhellenios (Panhellenic Zeus), again at Aegina.

=== Rome and Italy ===
In autumn 1814, Stackelberg returned from Greece to his family in the Baltic States. He travelled to Italy again in 1816, researching antiquity and the Middle Ages as an art historian and becoming co-founder of the "Instituto Archeologico Germanico" in Rome. Together with Eduard Gerhard, August Kestner and Theodor Panofka, he also established in 1824 the "Hyperboreans" ("Römischen Hyperboraeer") there, a group of northern European scholars who studied classical ruins. Both were the precursors and embryonic stages of the later German Archaeological Institute. In 1826 Stackelberg's archaeological work was published as Der Apollotempel zu Bassae in Arcadien und die daselbst ausgegrabenen Bildwerke (The Temple of Apollo at Bassae in Arcadia, and the Wall-paintings excavated there), for which he also provided the drawings. Also during this time in Rome in the middle of his life, Stackelberg undertook further trips to Greece, to Turkey and within Italy. In Etruria in 1827 he discovered the Etruscan temple and hypogaeum at Corneto (now Tarquinia).

=== Later life and death ===
In 1828 Stackelberg left Rome and Italy for the last time. From 1829 to 1833 he lived once again in Germany, meeting there among others Johann Wolfgang von Goethe and travelling to England, France and the Netherlands. From 1835 he lived in Riga.

== Reception ==
His daughter Natalie von Stackelberg published a biography of him in 1882 on the basis of her father's journals and letters. In his biography of von Stackelberg, Gerhart Rodenwaldt called him the "discoverer of the [ancient] Greek landscape".

== See also ==
- List of Baltic Germans

== Works ==
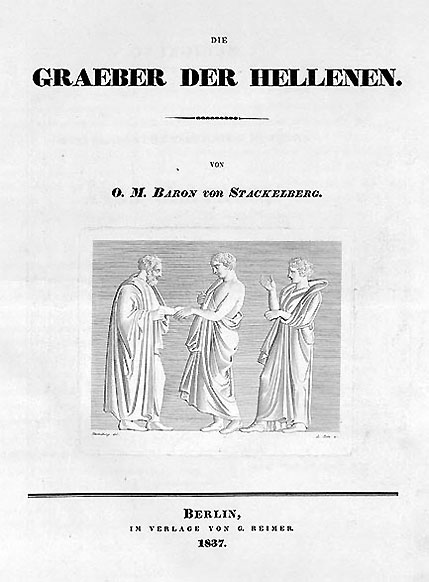
Title page of Die Gräber der Hellenen in Bildwerken und Vasengemälden

- Costumes et usages des peuples de la Grèce moderne / Trachten und Gebräuche der Neugriechen (Costumes and customs of the peoples of modern Greece). Rome 1825.
- Der Apollotempel zu Bassae in Arcadien und die daselbst ausgegrabenen Bildwerke. (The Temple of Apollo at Bassae in Arcadia, and the Wall-paintings excavated there). Rome 1826.
- La Grèce. Vues pittoresques et topographiques, dessinus par O. M. baron de Stackelberg. (Greece - Picturesque views and topographic views, drawn by Otto Magnus, baron of Stackelberg). Paris 1830.
- Die Gräber der Hellenen in Bildwerken und Vasengemälden (The Graves of the Greeks in Wall-paintings and Vase-paintings). Berlin 1837. Accessible on Universität Heidelberg.

== Bibliography ==
- Gerhart Rodenwaldt, Otto Magnus von Stackelberg. Der Entdecker der griechischen Landschaft 1786–1837, Deutscher Kunstverlag, Berlin-München 1957
