= Vääna =

Village in Estonia

- Village
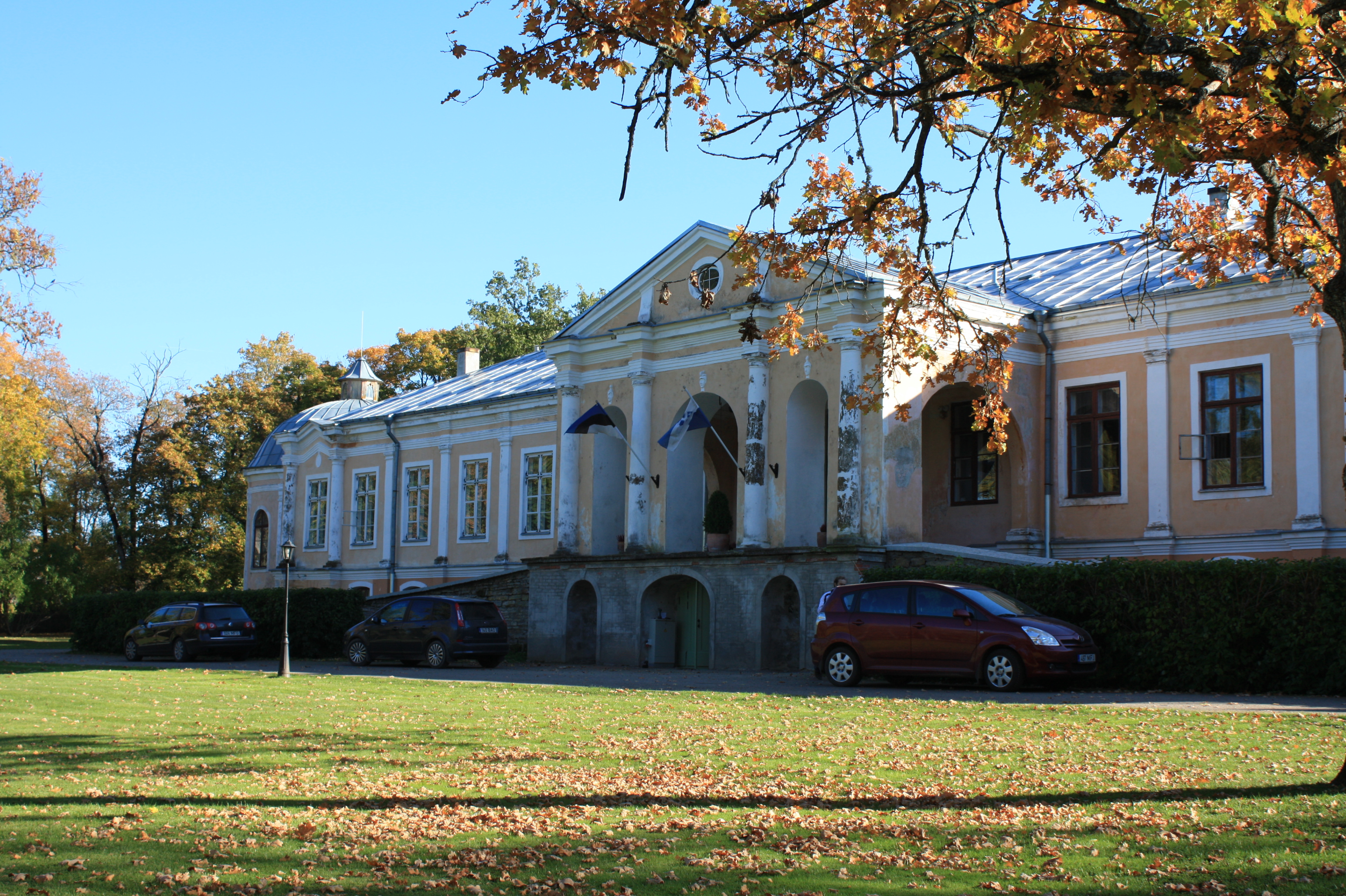
- Vääna Manor

- Location in Estonia
- Coordinates: 59°23′18″N 24°24′43″E
- Country: Estonia
- County: Harju County
- Municipality: Harku Parish

Population (01.06.2010)
  - Total: 266

Vääna (German: Feyena, Faehna, Fähna) is a village in Harku Parish, Harju County in northern Estonia. It has a population of 266 (as of 1 June 2010). Vääna is located about 20 km (12 mi) from the capital Tallinn.

== Vääna Manor ==
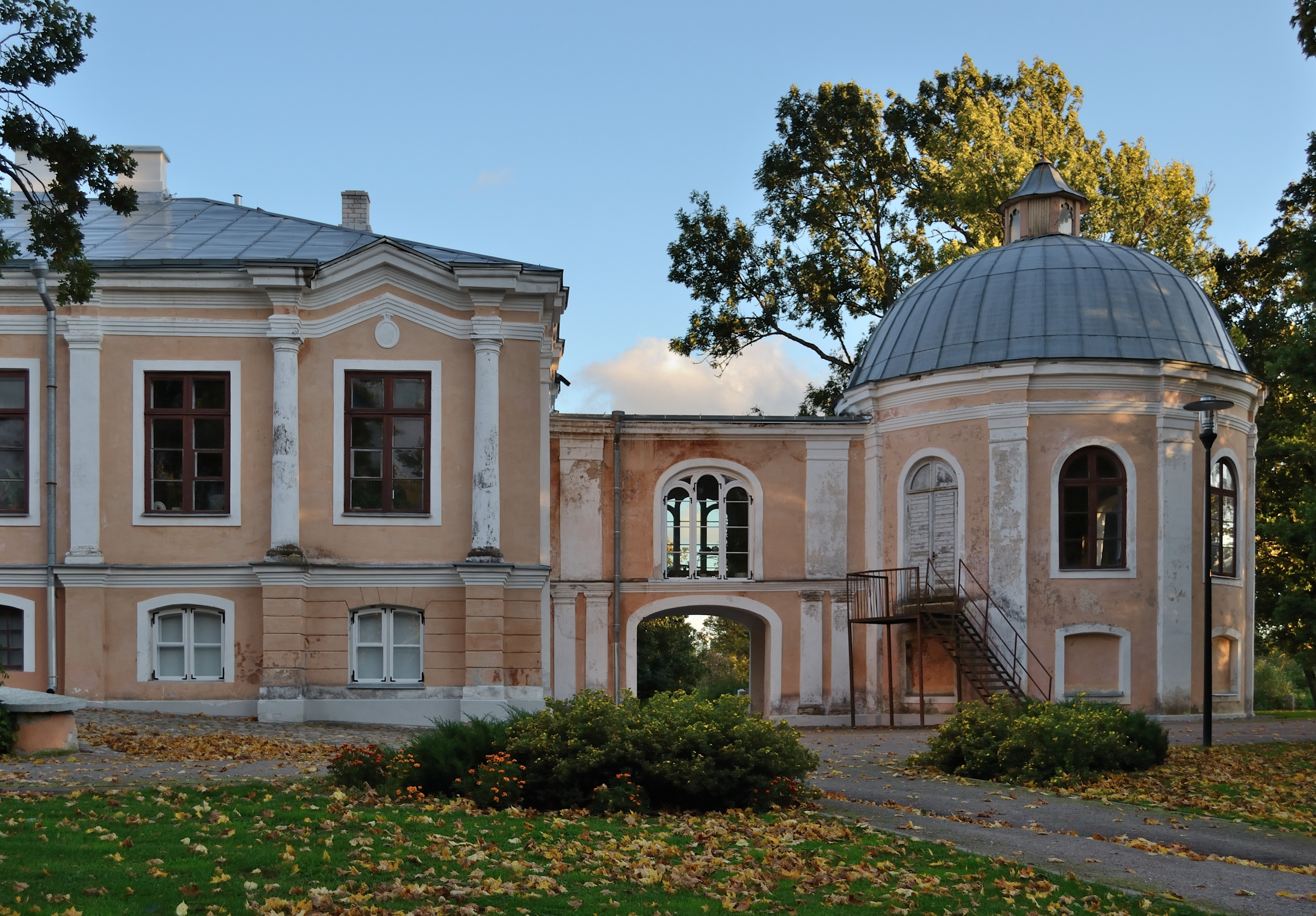
Vääna manor, one of the wings

The oldest recorded mention of the place (Feyena) has been dated to 1325. At this time, there was a fortified manor or a castle at the site, the remains of which were reconstructed and expanded in a romantic fashion during the 19th century but are still visible in the manor park.

The present manor house was commissioned by the Baltic German von Stackelberg family and built 1784-1797. It was designed by an anonymous Italian architect in late baroque style. The wings of the long main house have circular pavilions with preserved decorated vaulted roofs, where formerly the family displayed their art collection, which reputedly held works by Hans Holbein, Nicolas Poussin, Claude Lorrain and Antoine Watteau . The main building also showcases some preserved architectural details, notably two painted ceilings as well as further, albeit later, architectural details.

Drone video of Vääna manor

The most famous resident of the manor house was the archaeologist Otto Magnus von Stackelberg who grew up there.

Nowadays the manor houses a kindergarten-elementary school (est. 1855), a public library and a public Internet point of access.

== Railroad line ==
In 1913 a narrow-gauge, military-purpose railroad connecting Vääna and Tallinn was opened. Its initial purpose was supplying forts and defensive positions of Peter the Great's Naval Fortress, located in the vicinity of Vääna. In 1933 railroad was handed over to Estonian Railways and used for passenger transport, until the line was finally closed in 1959. There is still an old station building on the north-eastern edge of the village.

== People ==
Actress Anne Margiste was born in Vääna in 1942.
