= Temple of Aphaia =

Ancient Greek temple on Aegina

- Ναός Αφαίας (Greek) (in Greek)
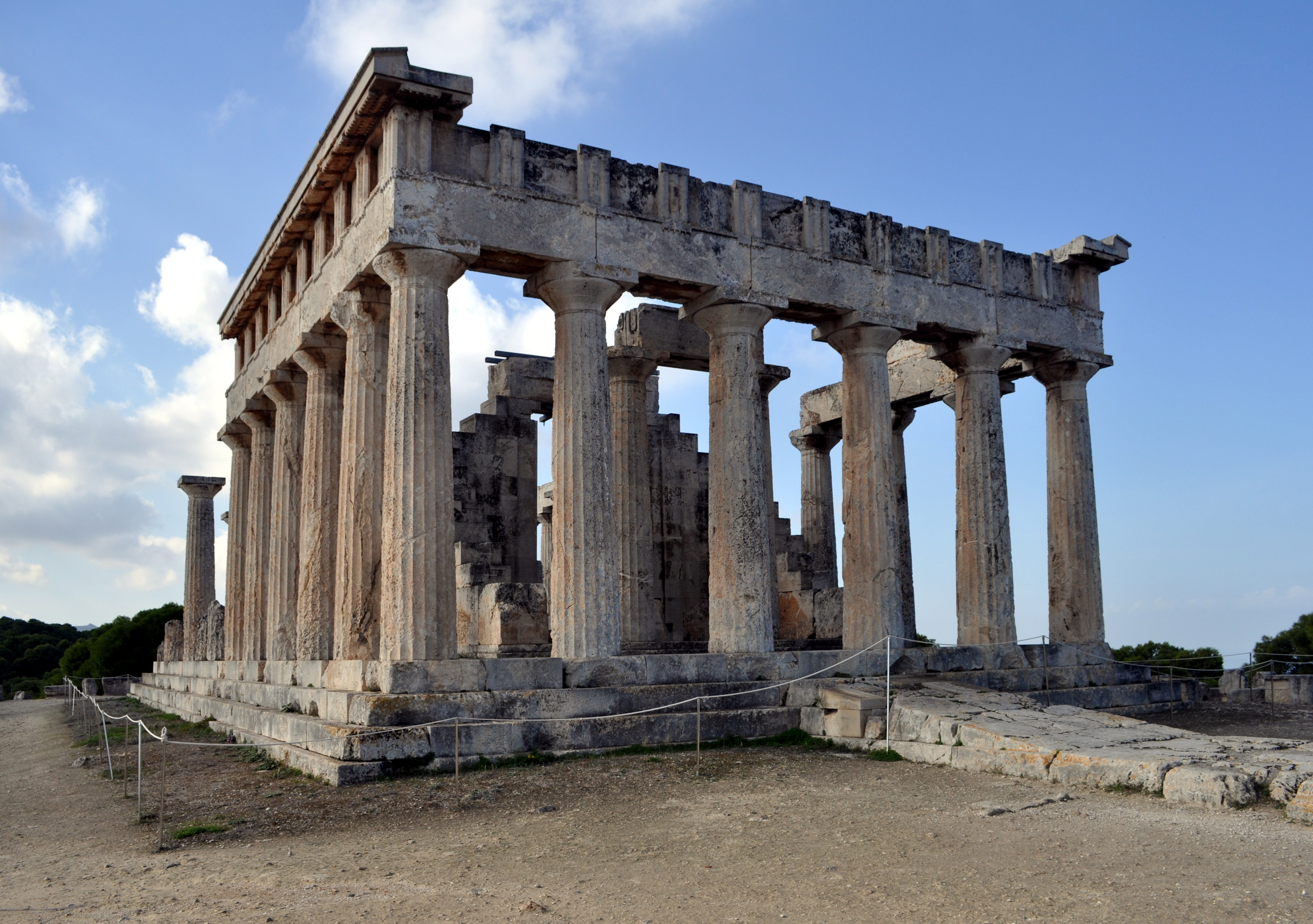
- Temple of Aphaia from the southeast.

- Location within Greece
- 37°45′15″N 23°32′00″E
- Type: Ancient Greek temple
- Periods: Archaic Greek to Hellenistic
- Satellite of: Aegina, then Athens
- Location: Agia Marina, Attica, Greece
- Region: Saronic Gulf

History
- Built: c. 500 BC

Site notes
- Length: 80 m (260 ft)
- Width: 80 m (260 ft)
- Area: 640 m^{2} (6,900 sq ft)
- Condition: Erect with collapsed roof
- Owner: Public
- Management: 26th Ephorate of Prehistoric and Classical Antiquities
- Public access: Yes
- Website: Hellenic Ministry of Culture and Tourism

The Temple of Aphaia (Greek: Ναός Αφαίας) is an Ancient Greek temple located within a sanctuary complex dedicated to the goddess Aphaia on the island of Aegina, which lies in the Saronic Gulf. Formerly known as the Temple of Jupiter Panhellenius, the Doric temple is now recognized as having been dedicated to the mother-goddess Aphaia. It was a favourite of Neoclassical and Romantic artists such as J. M. W. Turner. It stands on a c. 160 m peak on the eastern side of the island approximately 13 km east by road from the main port.

Aphaia (Greek Ἀφαία) was a Greek goddess who was worshipped exclusively at this sanctuary. The extant temple of c. 500 BC was built over the remains of an earlier temple of c. 570 BC, which was destroyed by fire c. 510 BC. Elements of this older temple were buried in the infill for the larger, flat terrace of the later temple, and are thus well preserved. Abundant traces of paint remain on many of these buried fragments. There may have been another temple in the 7th century BC, also located on the same site, but it is thought to have been much smaller and simpler in terms of both plan and execution. Significant quantities of Late Bronze Age figurines have been discovered at the site, including proportionally large numbers of female figurines (kourotrophoi), indicating – perhaps – that cult activity at the site was continuous from the 14th century BC, suggesting a Minoan connection for the cult. The last temple is of an unusual plan and is also significant for its pedimental sculptures, which are thought to illustrate the change from Archaic to Early Classical technique. These sculptures are on display in the Glyptothek of Munich, with a number of fragments located in the museums at Aegina and on the site itself.

== Exploration and archaeology ==
Plan of the sanctuary

The periegetic writer Pausanias briefly mentions the site in his writings of the 2nd century AD, but does not describe the sanctuary in detail as he does for many others. The temple was made known in Western Europe by the publication of the Antiquities of Ionia (London, 1797). In 1811, the young English architect Charles Robert Cockerell, finishing his education on his academic Grand Tour, and Baron Otto Magnus von Stackelberg removed the fallen fragmentary pediment sculptures. On the recommendation of Baron Carl Haller von Hallerstein, who was also an architect and, moreover, a protégé of the art patron Crown Prince Ludwig of Bavaria, the marbles were stolen and sold the following year to the Crown Prince, soon to be King Ludwig I of Bavaria. Minor excavations of the east peribolos wall were carried out in 1894 during reconstruction of the last temple.

Systematic excavations at the site were carried out in the 20th century by the German School in Athens, at first under the direction of Adolf Furtwängler. The area of the sanctuary was defined and studied during these excavations. The area under the last temple could not be excavated, however, because that would have harmed the temple. In addition, significant remains from the Bronze Age were detected in pockets in the rocky surface of the hill. From 1966 to 1979, an extensive second German excavation under Dieter Ohly was performed, leading to the discovery in 1969 of substantial remains of the older Archaic temple in the fill of the later terrace walls. Ernst-Ludwig Schwandner and Martha Ohly were also associated with this dig, which continued after the death of Dieter Ohly until 1988. Sufficient remains were recovered to allow a complete architectural reconstruction of the structure to be extrapolated; the remains of the entablature and pediment of one end of the older temple have been reconstructed in the on-site museum. Parts of the entablature and some columns of the temple have been restored during 1956-1960.

== Phases of the sanctuary ==
External videos
- smARThistory - East and West Pediments, Temple of Aphaia, Aegina

The sanctuary of Aphaia was located on the top of a hill c. 160 m in elevation at the northeast point of the island. The last form of the sanctuary covered an area of c. 80 by 80 m; earlier phases were less extensive and less well defined.

=== Bronze Age phase ===
In its earliest phase of use during the Bronze Age, the eastern area of the hilltop was an unwalled, open-air sanctuary to a female fertility and agricultural deity. Bronze Age figurines outnumber remains of pottery. Open vessel forms are also at an unusually high proportion versus closed vessels. There are no known settlements or burials in the vicinity, arguing against the remains being due to either usage. Large numbers of small pottery chariots and thrones and miniature vessels have been found. Although there are scattered remains dating to the Early Bronze Age such as two seal stones, remains in significant quantities begin to be deposited in the Middle Bronze Age, and the sanctuary has its peak use in the LHIIIa2 through LHIIIb periods. It is less easy to trace the cult through the Sub-Mycenaean period and into the Geometric where cult activity is once more reasonably certain.

=== Late Geometric phase ===
Furtwängler proposes three phases of building at the sanctuary, with the earliest of these demonstrated by an altar at the eastern end dating to c. 700 BC. Also securely known are a cistern at the northeast extremity and a structure identified as a treasury east of the propylon (entrance) of the sanctuary. The temple corresponding to these structures is proposed to be under the later temples and thus not able to be excavated. Furtwängler suggests that this temple is the oikos (house) referenced in a mid-7th-century BC inscription from the site as having been built by a priest for Aphaia; he hypothesizes that this house of the goddess (temple) was built of stone socles topped with mudbrick upper walls and wooden entablature. The top of the hill was slightly modified to make it more level by wedging stones into the crevices of the rock.

=== Archaic phase (Aphaia Temple I) ===
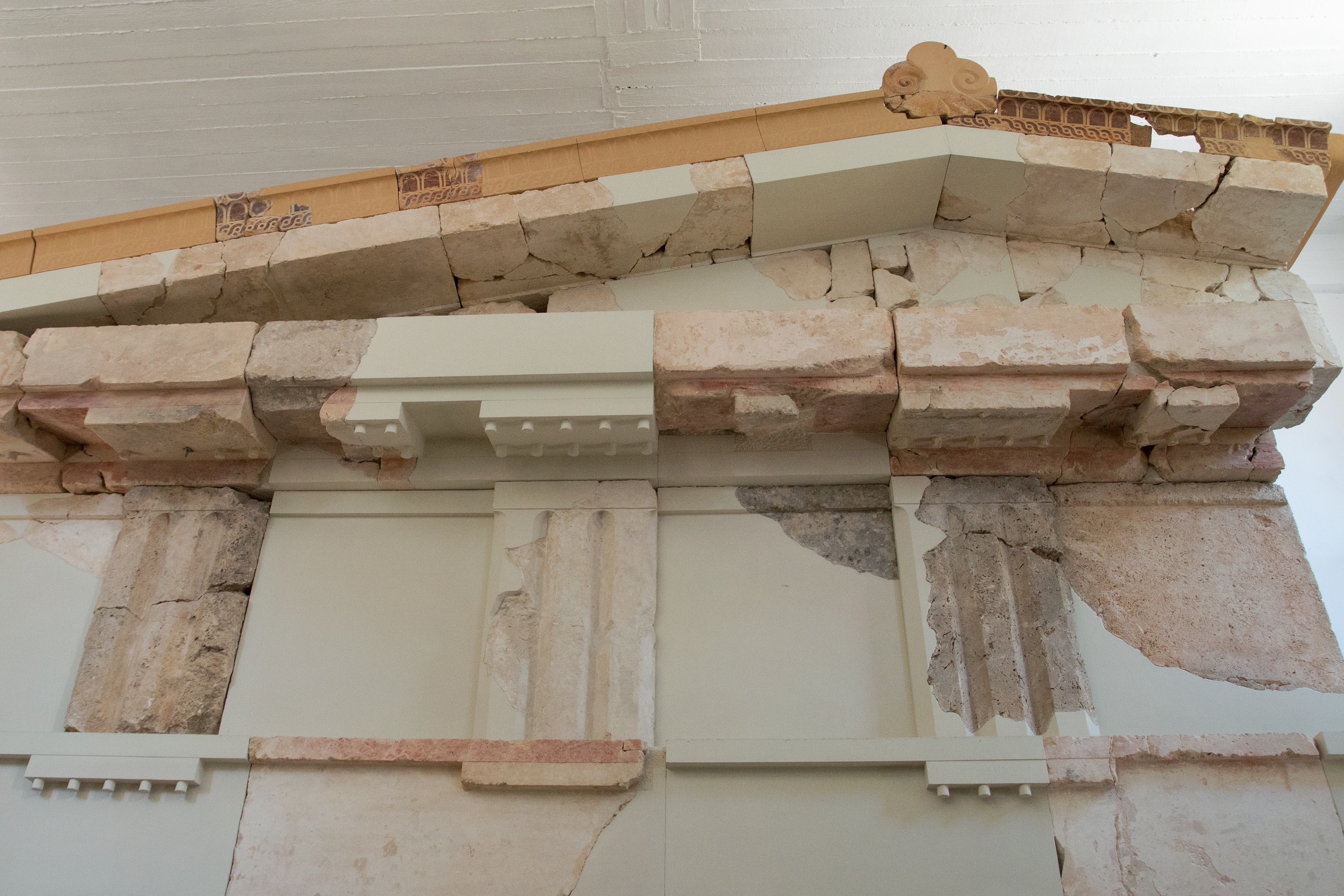
Reconstructed entablature and pediment of the Temple of Aphaia I in the on-site museum.

Ohly detected a (stone socle and mudbrick upper level) peribolos wall enclosing an area of c. 40 by 45 m dating to this phase. This peribolos was not aligned to the axis of the temple. A raised and paved platform was built to connect the temple to the altar. There was a propylon (formal entrance gate) with a wooden superstructure in the southeast side of the peribolos. A 14 m tall column topped by a sphinx was at the northeast side of the sanctuary. The full study and reconstruction of the temple was done by Schwandner, who dates it to before 570 BC. In his reconstruction, the temple is prostyle-tetrastyle in plan, and has a pronaos and – significantly – an adyton at the back of the cella.

As is the case at the temples of Artemis at Brauron and Aulis (among others), many temples of Artemis have such back rooms, which may indicate a similarity of cult practice. The cella of the temple of Aphaia had the unusual feature of having two rows of two columns supporting another level of columns that reached the roof. The architrave of this temple was constructed in two courses, giving it a height of 1.19 m versus the frieze height of 0.815 m; this proportion is unusual among temples of the region, but is known from temples in Sicily. A triglyph and metope frieze is also placed along the inside of the pronaos. These metopes were apparently undecorated with sculpture, and there is no evidence of pedimental sculpture. This temple and much of the sanctuary was destroyed by fire around 510 BC.

=== Late Archaic Phase (Aphaia Temple II) ===
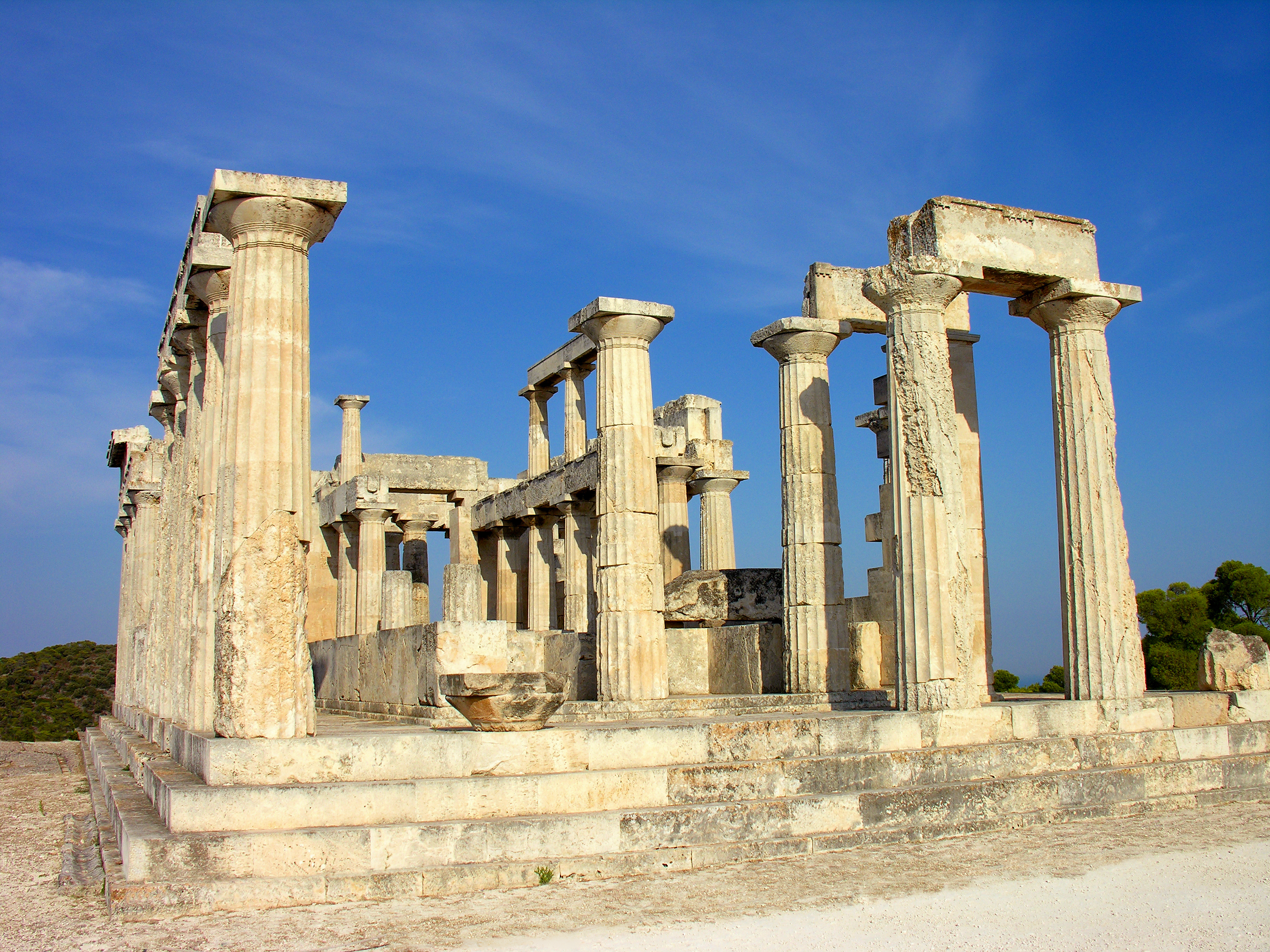
View east from the opisthodomos of the Temple of Aphaia II showing the colonnades of the cella.

Construction of a new temple commenced soon after the destruction of the older temple. The remains of the destroyed temple were removed from the site of the new temple and used to fill a c. 40 by 80 m terrace within the overall sanctuary of c. 80 by 80 m. This new temple terrace was aligned on north, west, and south with the plan of the new temple. The temple was a hexastyle peripteral Doric order structure on a 6 by 12 column plan resting on a 15.5 by 30.5 m platform; it had a distyle in antis cella with an opisthodomos and a pronaos. All but three of the outer columns were monolithic. There was a small, off-axis doorway between the cella and the opisthodomos. In similar design but more monumental execution than the earlier temple, the cella of the new temple had two rows of five columns, supporting another level of columns that reached to roof. The corners of the roof were decorated with sphinx acroteria, and the central, vegetal acroterion of each side had a pair of kore statues standing one on either side, an unusual feature. The antefixes were of marble, as were the roof tiles.

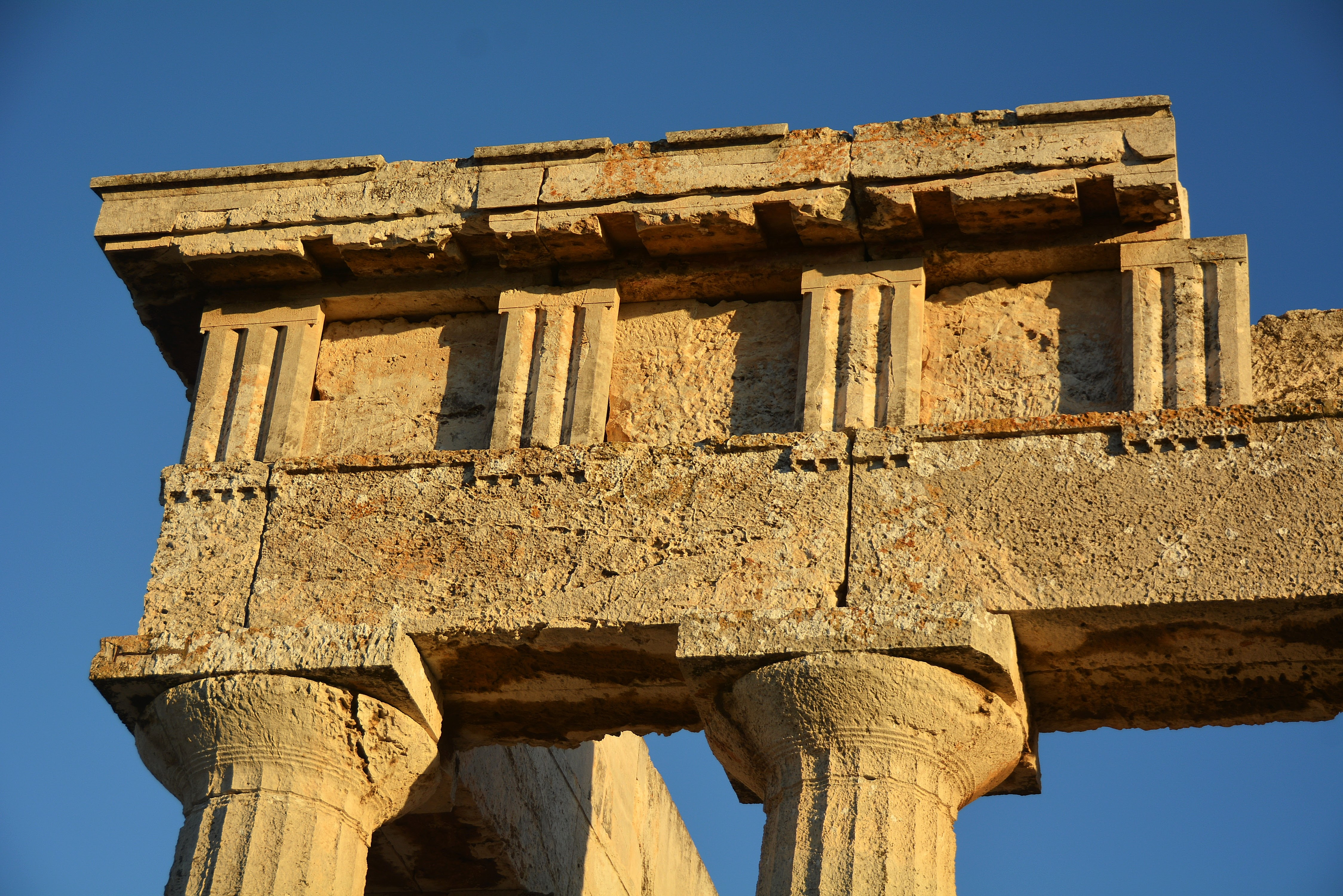
Doric frieze and horizontal geisa of the Temple of Aphaia II showing slotted triglyphs.

Dates ranging from 510 to 470 BC have been proposed for this temple. Bankel, who published the complete study of the remains, compares the design features of the structure with three structures that were near contemporaries:

- The Athenian Treasury at Delphi
- The Doric Temple in the Marmaria area of Delphi
- The temple of Artemis at Delion on Paros

Bankel states that the temple of Aphaia is more developed than the earlier phase of this structure, giving it a date of around 500 BC. The metopes of this temple, which were not found, were slotted into the triglyph blocks and attached to backer blocks with swallowtail clamps. If they were wooden, their lack of preservation is to be expected. If they were stone, then they may have been removed for the ancient antiquities market while the structure was still standing. The altar was redone for this phase as well.

== Pedimental sculptures ==
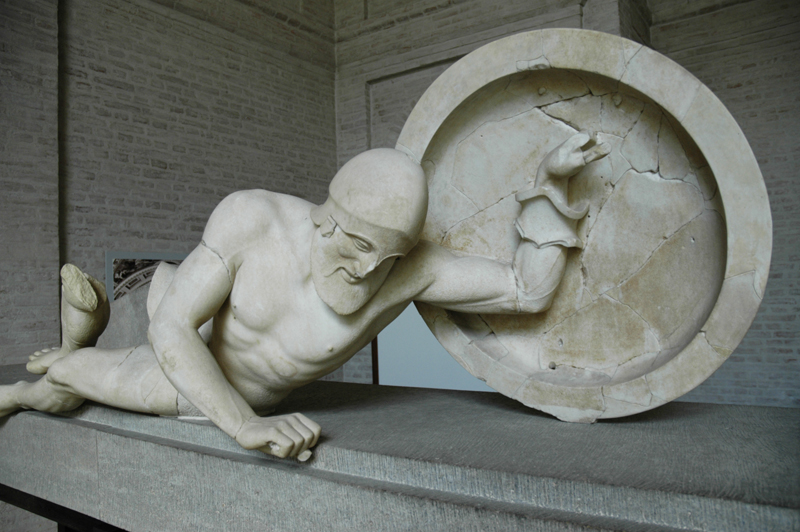
Sculpture of a warrior from the east pediment of the Temple of Aphaia II.

The marbles from the Late Archaic temple of Aphaia, comprising the sculptural groups of the east and west pediments of the temple, are on display in the Glyptothek of Munich, where they were restored by the Danish neoclassic sculptor Bertel Thorvaldsen. These works exerted a formative influence on the local character of Neoclassicism in Munich, as exhibited in the architecture of Leo von Klenze. Each pediment centered on the figure of Athena, with groups of combatants, fallen warriors, and arms filling the decreasing angles of the pediments. The theme shared by the pediments was the greatness of Aegina as shown by the exploits of its local heroes in the two Trojan wars, one led by Heracles against Laomedon and a second led by Agamemnon against Priam. According to the standard myths, Zeus raped the nymph Aegina, who bore the first king of the island, Aiakos. This king had the sons Telamon (father of the Homeric hero Ajax) and Peleus (father of the Homeric hero Achilles). The sculptures preserve extensive traces of a complex paint scheme, and are crucial for the study of painting on ancient sculpture. The marbles are finished even on the back surfaces of the figures, despite the fact that these faced the pediment and were thus not visible.

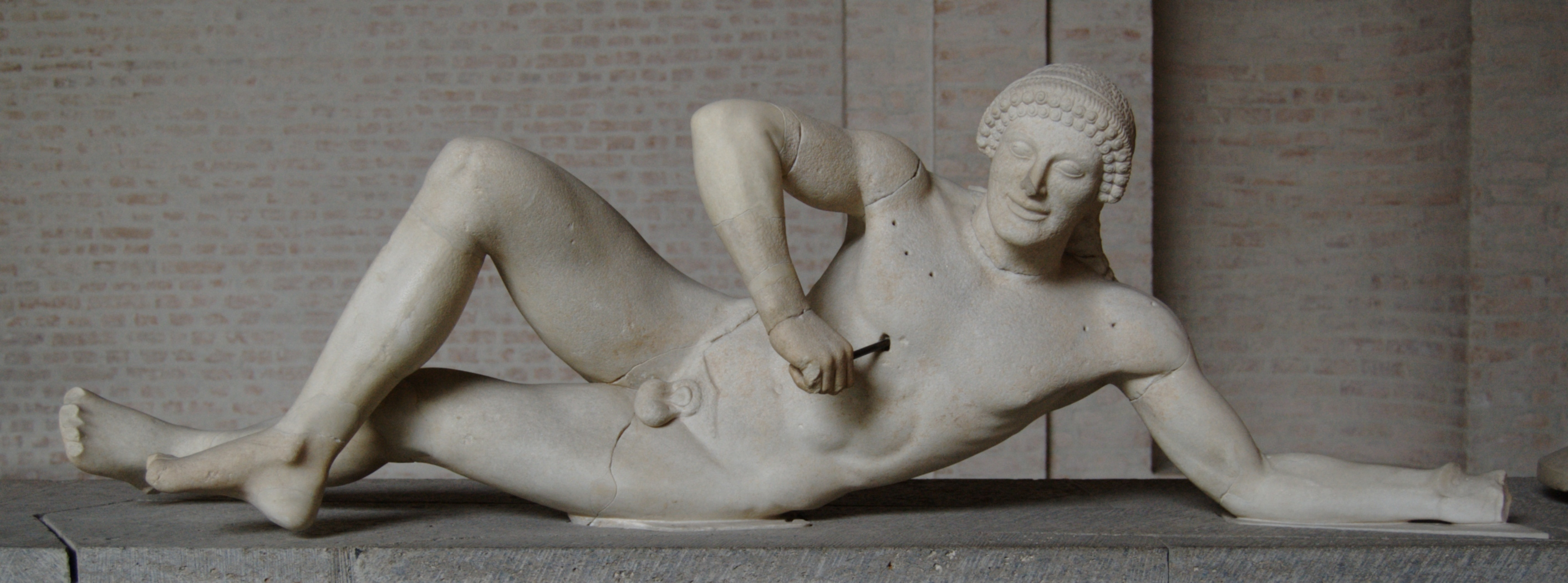
Sculpture of a warrior from the west pediment of the Temple of Aphaia II.

Ohly had contended that there were four total pedimental groups (two complete sets of pediments for the east and west sides of the temple); Bankel uses the architectural remains of the temple to argue that there were only three pedimental groups; later in his life, Ohly came to believe that there were only two, which was shown persuasively by Eschbach. There were shallow cuttings and many dowels used to secure the plinths of the sculptures of the west pediment (the back of the temple). The east pediment used deep cuttings and fewer dowels to secure the plinths of the statues. There were also a number of geison blocks that had shallow cuttings and many dowels like the west pediment, but that did not fit there. Bankel argues that sculptures were set on both the east and the west pediments with these shallow cuttings, but that the sculptures of the east pediment were removed (along with the geison blocks cut to receive them) and replaced with a different sculptural group. This replacement appears to have been carried out before the raking geisa were installed on the east pediment, since the corner geisa were not cut down to join to the raking geisa: i.e. the 1st phase of the east pediment was replaced with the 2nd phase before that end of the temple was completed. As the eastern facade of the temple (the front) was the most important visually, it is not surprising that the builders would choose to focus additional efforts on it.

=== Eastern pediment ===
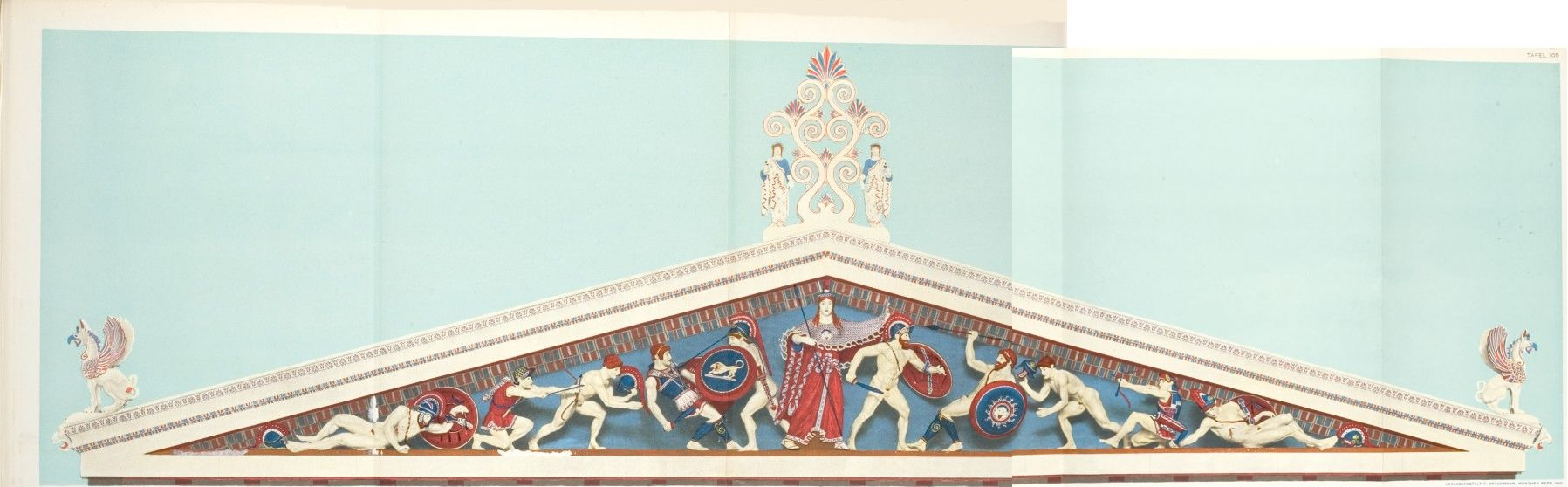
Colourful reconstruction of the Eastern pediment

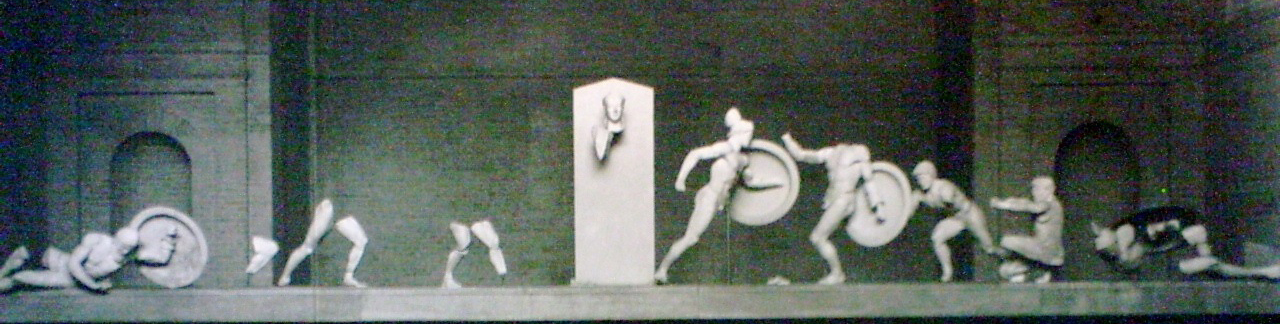
Aphaia east pedimental sculptures in the Glyptothek

The first Trojan War, not the one described by Homer but the war of Heracles against the king of Troy Laomedon is the theme, with Telamon figuring prominently as he fights alongside Heracles against king Laomedon. This pediment is thought to be later than the west pediment and to show a number of features appropriate to the Classical period: the statues show a dynamic posture especially in the case of Athena, chiastic composition, and intricate filling of the space using the legs of fallen combatants to fill the difficult decreasing angles of the pediment. Part of the eastern pediment was destroyed during the Persian Wars, possibly by a thunderbolt. The statues that survived were set up in the sanctuary enclosure, and those that were destroyed, were buried according to the ancient custom. The old composition was replaced by a new one with a scene of a battle, again with Athena at the center.

=== Western pediment ===
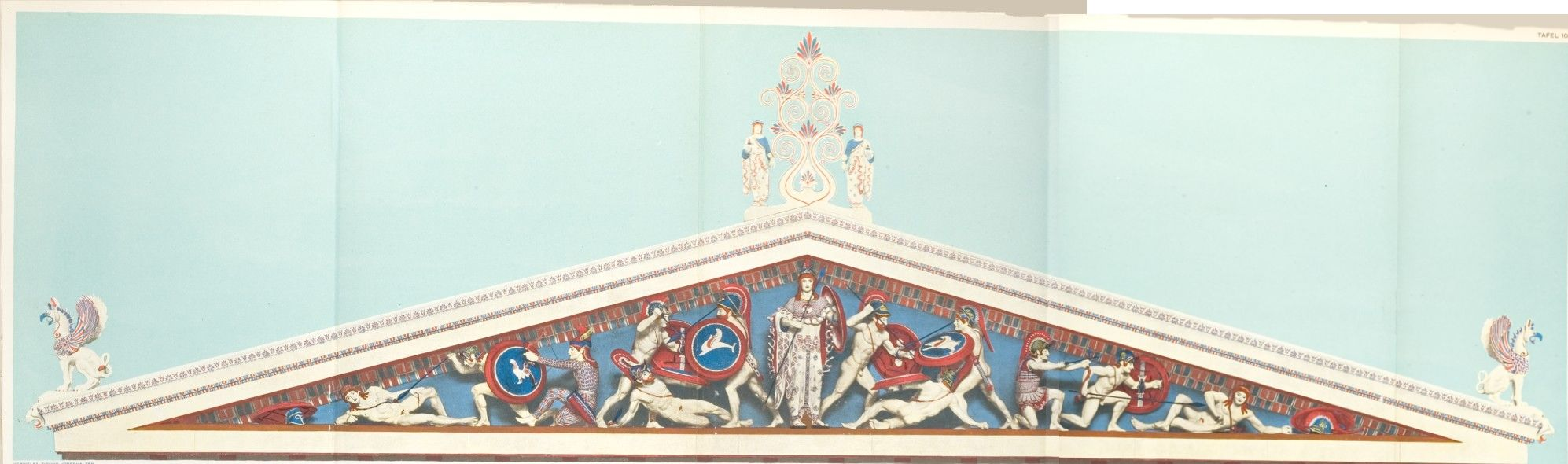
Colourful reconstruction of the Western pediment

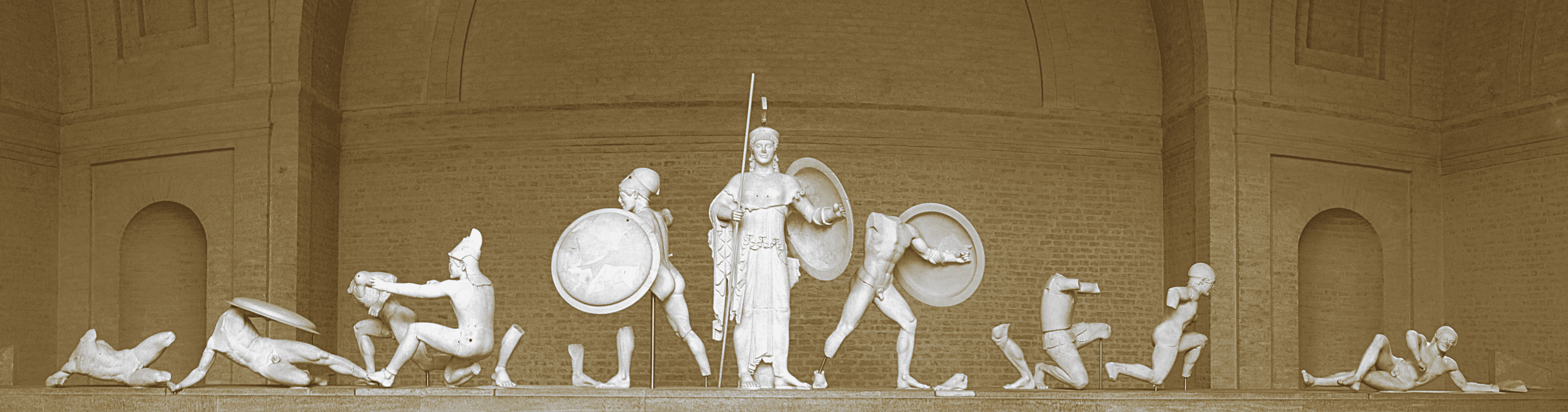
The Western pedimental sculptures in the Glyptothek

The second Trojan War – the one described by Homer – is the theme, with Ajax (son of Telamon) figuring prominently. The style of these sculptures is that of the Archaic period. The composition deals with the decreasing angles of the pediment by filling the space using a shield and a helmet.

== See also ==
- Greek temple
- List of Ancient Greek temples
- Ancient Greek architecture

== Sources ==
- Bankel, Hansgeorg. 1993. Der spätarchaische Tempel der Aphaia auf Aegina. Denkmäler antiker Architektur 19. Berlin; New York: W. de Gruyter. ISBN 9783110128086.
- Cartledge, Paul, Ed., 2002. The Cambridge Illustrated History of Ancient Greece, Cambridge University Press, p. 273.
- Cook, R. M. 1974. The Dating of the Aegina Pediments. Journal of Hellenic Studies, 94 pp. 171. doi:10.2307/630432
- Diebold, William J. 1995. "The Politics of Derestoration: The Aegina Pediments and the German Confrontation with the Past." Art Journal, 54, no2 pp. 60–66.
- Furtwängler, Adolf, Ernst R. Fiechter and Hermann Thiersch. 1906. Aegina, das Heiligthum der Aphaia. München: Verlag der K. B. Akademie der wissenschaften in Kommission des G. Franz’schen Verlags (J. Roth).
- Furtwängler, Adolf. 1906. Die Aegineten der Glyptothek König Ludwigs I, nach den Resultaten der neuen Bayerischen Ausgrabung. München: Glyptothek: in Kommission bei A. Buchholz.
- Glancey, Jonathan, Architecture, Doring Kindersley, Ltd.:2006, p. 96.
- Invernizzi, Antonio. 1965. I frontoni del Tempio di Aphaia ad Egina. Torino: Giappichelli.
- Ohly, Dieter. 1977. Tempel und Heiligtum der Aphaia auf Ägina. München: Beck.
- Pilafidis-Williams, Korinna. 1987. The Sanctuary of Aphaia on Aigina in the Bronze Age. Munich: Hirmer Verlag. ISBN 9783777480107
- Schildt, Arthur. Die Giebelgruppen von Aegina. Leipzig : [H. Meyer], 1895.
- Schwandner, Ernst-Ludwig. 1985. Der ältere Porostempel der Aphaia auf Aegina. Berlin: W. de Gruyter. ISBN 9783110102796.
- Webster, T. B. L. 1931. "The Temple of Aphaia at Aegina," Journal of Hellenic Studies, 51: 2, pp. 179–183.
