= Aphaia =

Greek goddess

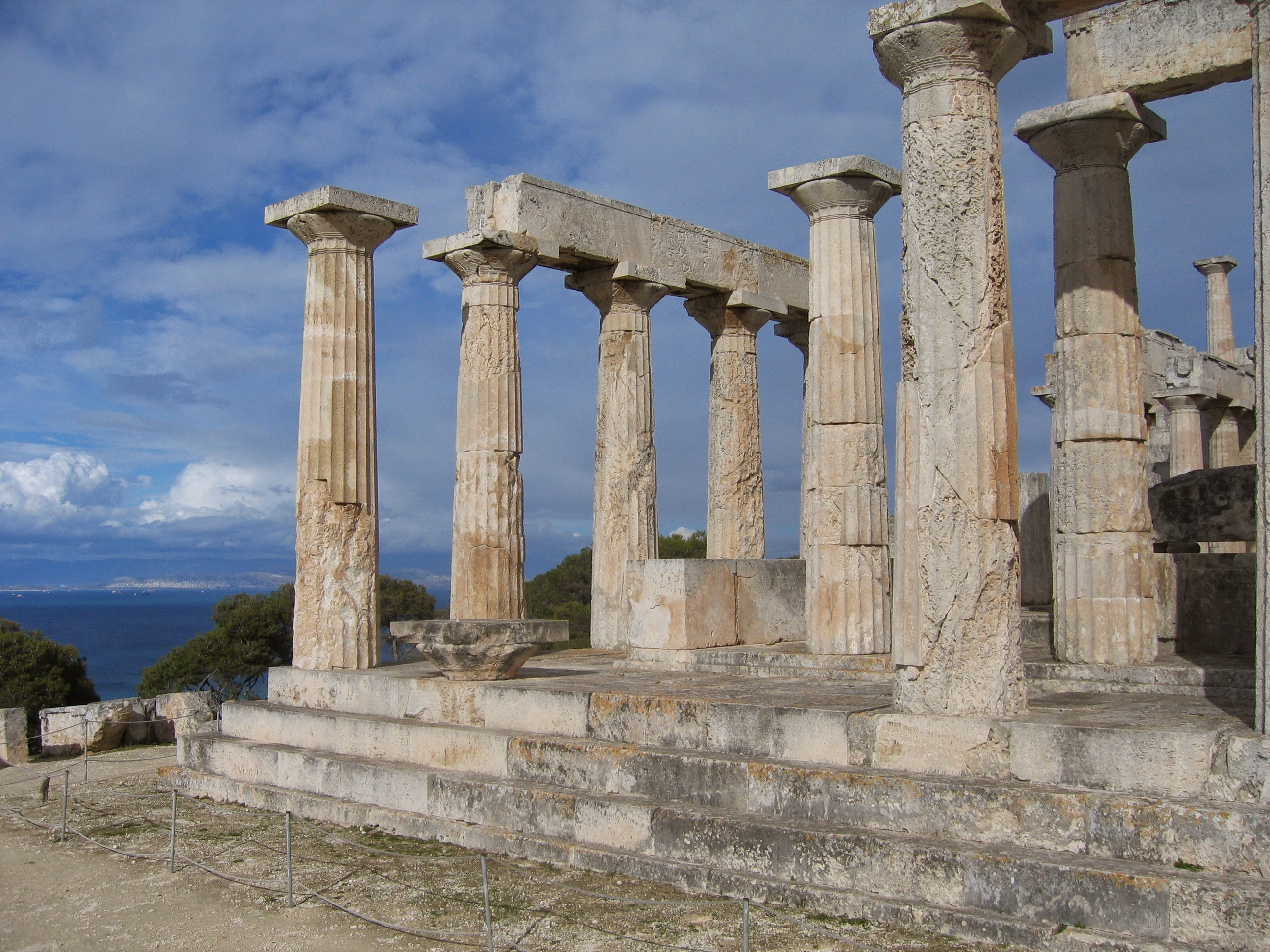
Temple of Aphaia on the island of Aegina.

Aphaia (Ancient Greek: Ἀφαία, Aphaía) was a Greek goddess who was worshipped almost exclusively at a single sanctuary on the island of Aegina in the Saronic Gulf.

== Cult and worship ==
She originated as early as the 14th century BCE as a local deity associated with fertility and the agricultural cycle. Under the later Athenian hegemony she came to be identified with the goddesses Athena and Artemis and with the nymph Britomartis as well, by the 2nd century CE, the time of Pausanias:

On Aegina as one goes toward the mountain of Zeus, god of all the Hellenes, the sanctuary of Aphaia comes up, for whom Pindar composed an ode at the behest of the Aeginetans. The Cretans say (the myths about her are native to Crete) that Euboulos was the son of Kharmanor, who purified Apollo of the killing of the Python, and they say that Britomartis was the daughter of Zeus and Kharme (the daughter of this Euboulos). She enjoyed races and hunts and was particularly dear to Artemis. While fleeing from Minos, who lusted after her, she cast herself into nets cast for a catch of fish. Artemis made her a goddess, and not only the Cretans but also the Aeginetans revere her. The Aeginetans say that Britomartis showed herself to them on their island. Her epithet among the Aeginetans is Aphaia, and it is Diktynna of the Nets on Crete. Description of Greece 2.30.3

The remains of the Late Archaic period Temple of Aphaia are located within a sanctuary complex on a 160 meter peak at the northeastern end of the island: 37°45'14.82"N, 23°32'0.24"E. The extant temple was built at around 500 BCE on the site of an earlier temple that had burned around 510 BCE.

An inscribed potsherd of the 5th century BCE found in the precinct of the Temple of Apollo at Bassae in Arcadia is inscribed with what may be a dedication to Aphaia. If so, it would be the first known inscribed dedication to this goddess outside Aegina.
