= Jakob Linckh =

German painter

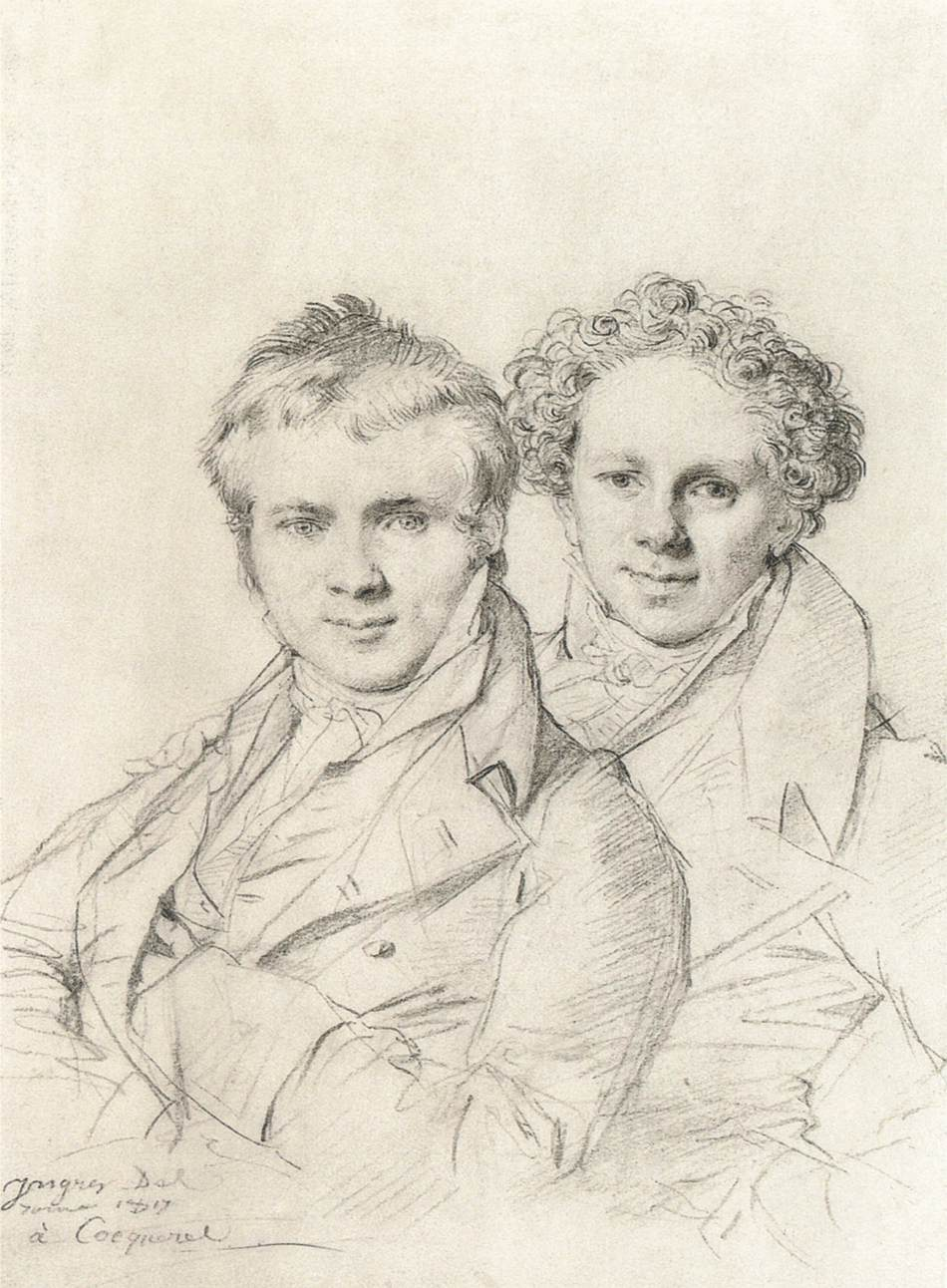
Double portrait of Jacob Linckh and Otto Magnus von Stackelberg by Jean-Auguste-Dominique Ingres

Jakob Linckh (1786 or 14 November 1787 – 1841) was a German painter and archaeologist, born in Cannstatt.

In 1810–11, he accompanied Charles Robert Cockerell, John Foster, Carl Haller von Hallerstein and Otto Magnus von Stackelberg on their expeditions to the temples of Aphaia on Aegina and of Apollo at Bassae, looting both temples. On this trip he also drew a plan of the ancient theatre at Eretria.
