= Asterius (giant) =

Greek mythological giant

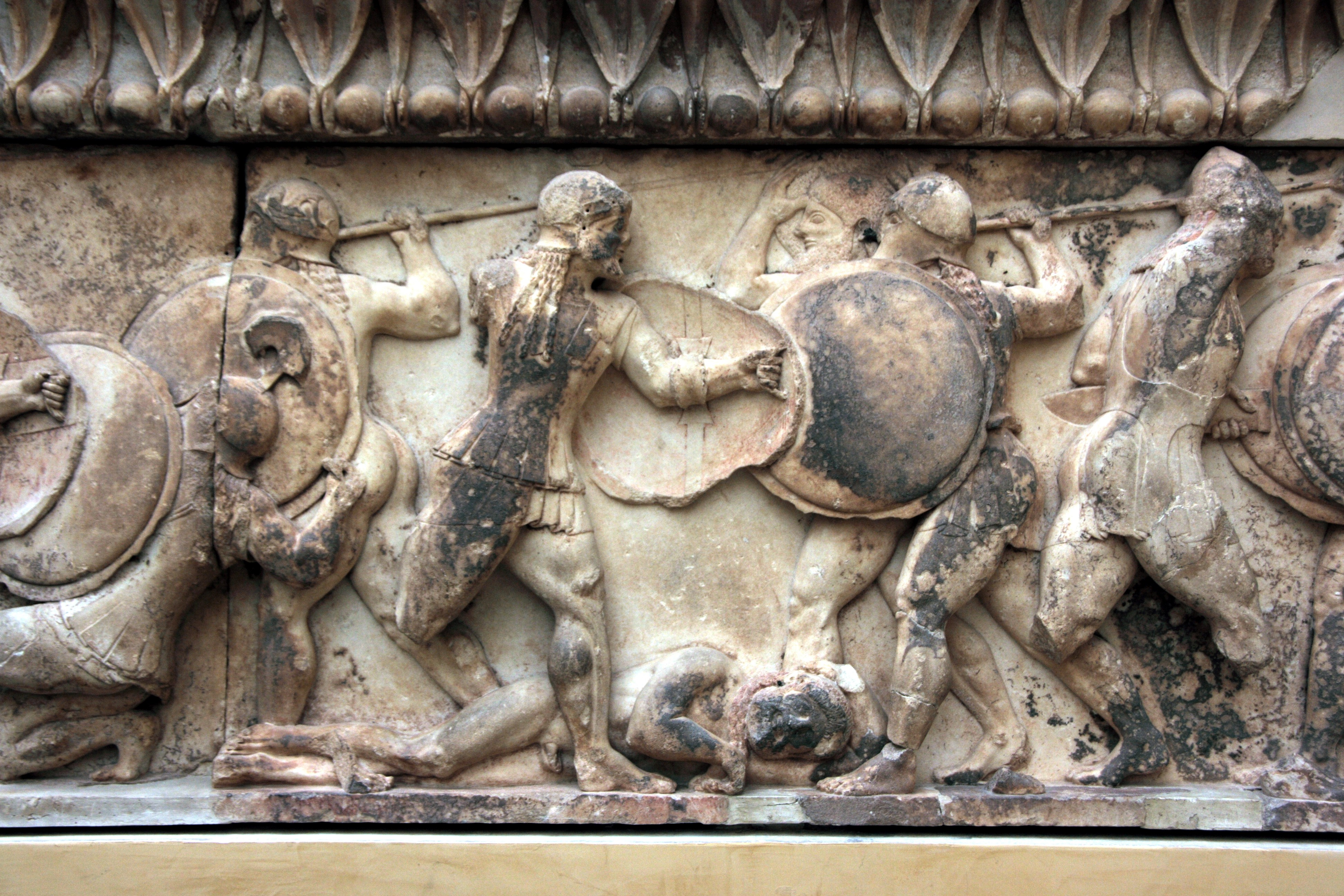
Asterius lies dead (on Ares's feet) on the northern frieze of the Siphnian Treasury, sixth century BC, Delphi Archaeological Museum, Greece.

In Greek mythology, Asterius (Ancient Greek: Ἀστέριος, romanized: Astérios, lit. 'starry') is a giant (usually among the ones who took arms against the gods), the child of the deities Gaia (the Earth) and Uranus (the Sky) who fought and was killed by the goddess Athena.

== Name ==
Asterius's name translates to 'starry', and thus 'glitterer, bright'. His name is also spelled Aster (Ancient Greek: Ἀστήρ, romanized: Astḗr, lit. 'star'), and another number of ways (see below). All variants derive from the word ἀστήρ, meaning 'star', which is itself inherited from the Proto-Indo-European root *h₂ster- (“star”), from *h₂eh₁s-, "to burn". Asterius' name thus shares an etymology with the names of Astraeus, Astraea, and Asteria.

== Mythology ==
A Giant opponent of Athena is depicted on the Siphnian Treasury, a sixth century BC marble depiction of the Gigantomachy from Delphi, labelled 'Astarias'. Astarias lies dead on the ground near a male figure that has been identified as either Ares or Achilles, as Athena goes on to fight another Giant named Erictypus.

In the epic poem Meropis, the Giant, here spelled as Asterus, is presented as an invulnerable warrior from the Aegean island of Kos, who battles Heracles during his fight against the Meropes, the Koan race of Giants; Athena intervenes to save Heracles from demise and kills Asterus by flaying him. This is paralleled in Apollodorus's account, who wrote that during the fight against the Giants, Athena flayed and killed Pallas, and then used his skin for her aegis. Euripides, in his play Ion also mentions a Giant that Athena flayed during the Gigantomachy and then proceeded to wear his hide, but he names him Gorgon.

Pausanias also tells of Asterius, a son of Anax who was the son of Earth (the goddess Gaia), buried on the island of Asterius, near the Island of Lade, off the coast of Miletus, having bones ten cubits in length.

== Culture ==
Asterius's killing by Athena was celebrated by the Athenians during the Panathenaea, a festival in honour of Athena; the Athenians claimed that the early inhabitants had set the festival up following the death of Asterius. The victory of the gods over the Giants was woven on the robe of the Panathenaea, perhaps with special emphasis on Athena's killing of Asterius, or maybe Enceladus.

== See also ==
- Aristaeus (giant)
- Mimas
- Picolous
- Porphyrion
- Polybotes

== Bibliography ==
- Apollodorus, The Library with an English Translation by Sir James George Frazer, F.B.A., F.R.S. in 2 Volumes, Cambridge, MA, Harvard University Press; London, William Heinemann Ltd. 1921. ISBN 0-674-99135-4. Online version at the Perseus Digital Library. Greek text available from the same website.
- Barber, E. J. W. (1991). Prehistoric Textiles: The Development of Cloth in the Neolithic and Bronze Ages with Special Reference to the Aegean. Princeton University Press. ISBN 9780691002248.
- Beekes, R. S. P. (2009). Lucien van Beek (ed.). Etymological Dictionary of Greek. Leiden Indo-European Etymological Dictionary Series. Vol. 1. Leiden, the Netherlands: Brill Publications. ISBN 978-90-04-17420-7.
- Brinkmann, Vinzenz (1985). "Die aufgemalten Namensbeischriften an Nord- und Ostfries des Siphnierschatzhauses". Bulletin de Correspondance Hellénique (in German). 109: 77–130.
- Connelly, Joan Breton (2014). The Parthenon Enigma. Knopf Doubleday Publishing Group. ISBN 978-0385350501.
- Euripides, Ion, translated by Robert Potter in The Complete Greek Drama, edited by Whitney J. Oates and Eugene O'Neill, Jr. Volume 1. New York. Random House. 1938.
- Janko, Richard (1992). The Iliad: A Commentary. Vol. 4, Books 13-16. Cambridge University Press. ISBN 978-0521237123.
- Liddell, Henry George; Scott, Robert (1940). A Greek-English Lexicon, revised and augmented throughout by Sir Henry Stuart Jones with the assistance of Roderick McKenzie. Oxford: Clarendon Press. Online version at Perseus.tufts project.
- Parker, Robert B. (2006). Polytheism and Society at Athens. Oxford, GBR: Oxford University Press, UK. ISBN 978-0199274833.
- Parker, Robert B. (2011). On Greek Religion. Cornell University Press. ISBN 978-0801462016.
- Pausanias, Pausanias Description of Greece with an English Translation by W.H.S. Jones, Litt.D., and H.A. Ormerod, M.A., in 4 Volumes. Cambridge, Massachusetts, Harvard University Press; London, William Heinemann Ltd. 1918. Online version at the Perseus Digital Library.
- Robertson, Noel (2001). "Athena as Weather-Goddess: the Aigis in Myth and Ritual". In Susan Deacy; Alexandra Villing (eds.). Athena in the Classical World. Brill Academic Pub. ISBN 9789004121423.
- Scheid, John; Svenbro, Jesper; Volk, Carol (2001). The Craft of Zeus: Myths of Weaving and Fabric. Penn State Press. ISBN 978-0674005785.
- Yasumura, Noriko (2013). Challenges to the Power of Zeus in Early Greek Poetry. Bloomsbury Academic. ISBN 978-1472504470.
