= Aristaeus (giant) =

Mythological Giant

In Greek mythology Aristaeus (/ærɪˈstiːəs/; Ancient Greek: Ἀρισταῖος, romanized: Aristaîos, lit. 'most excellent') is one of the Giants, the earth-born children of Gaia. The Sicilian Aristaeus took part in the battle against the Olympian gods, and he had the distinction of being the sole survivor of that battle.

== Mythology ==
This Aristaeus was one of the Giants, thus presumably a child of Gaia, the race that attacked the gods during the war that came to be known as the Gigantomachy. He is said to have been the sole Giant who survived the Gigantomachy and its aftermath, as the fire of heaven did not reach him, nor did Aetna harm him as he fled back to Sicily. There Aristaeus was transformed into the Etnaean dung beetle, a large bug called 'Etnaean' due to its large size. The ancient Greeks used a "beetle of Aetna" either as a comic exaggeration ("as huge as Aetna") or as referring to the actual size of the beetles on the mountain; Mount Etna was widely believed to be the home of a race of giant beetles.

== Iconography ==
He is probably named on an Attic black-figure dinos by Lydos (Akropolis 607) dating from the second quarter of the sixth century BC, where he is depicted fighting his opponent Hephaestus, the god of the forge.

== See also ==
- Alcyoneus
- Asterius
- Picolous
- Polybotes

== Bibliography ==
- Aeschylus, Fragments. Edited and translated by Alan H. Sommerstein. Loeb Classical Library 505. Cambridge, MA: Harvard University Press, 2009.
- Beazley, John D., The Development of Attic Black-Figure, Revised edition, University of California Press, 1986. ISBN 9780520055933. Online version at University of California Press E-Books Collection
- Gantz, Timothy, Early Greek Myth: A Guide to Literary and Artistic Sources, Johns Hopkins University Press, 1996, Two volumes: ISBN 978-0-8018-5360-9 (Vol. 1), ISBN 978-0-8018-5362-3 (Vol. 2).
- Richards, G.C., "Selected Vase-fragments from the Acropolis of Athens—I", The Journal of Hellenic Studies 13, The Society for the Promotion of Hellenic Studies, 1893, pp. 281–292.
- Schefold, Karl, Luca Giuliani, Gods and Heroes in Late Archaic Greek Art, Cambridge University Press, 1992 ISBN 9780521327183.
