= Mimas (Giant) =

Giant in Greek mythology

In Greek mythology, Mimas (Ancient Greek: Μίμας, Mimās) was one of the Gigantes (Giants), the offspring of Gaia, born from the blood of the castrated Uranus.

== Mythology ==
According to the mythographer Apollodorus, he was killed during the Gigantomachy, the cosmic battle of the Giants with the Twelve Olympians, by Hephaestus with "missiles of red-hot metal" from his forge. In Euripides's Ion (c. 410 BC), the chorus, describing the wonders of the late sixth century Temple of Apollo at Delphi, tell of seeing depicted there the Gigantomachy showing, among other things, Zeus burning Mimas "to ashes" with his thunderbolt. In the Argonautica by Apollonius of Rhodes, and the Gigantomachia by Claudian, Mimas was killed by Ares (or in Claudian's case by Ares's Roman counterpart Mars). Mimas is also mentioned in the company of other Giants, by the Latin writers Horace and Seneca.

He was said to be buried under Prochyte, one of the Phlegraean Islands off the coast of Naples. Claudian mentions Mimas as one of several vanquished Giants whose weapons, as spoils of war, hung on trees in a wood near the summit of Mount Etna.

== Iconography ==
A fragment of an Attic black-figure dinos by Lydos (Athens Akropolis 607) dating from the second quarter of the sixth century, which depicted the Gigantomachy, shows Aphrodite with shield and spear battling a Giant also with shield (displaying a large bee) and spear, whose name is inscribed (retrograde) as "Mimos", possibly in error for "Mimas".

Mimas is possibly the same as the Giant named Mimon on the Gigantomachy depicted on the north frieze of the Siphnian Treasury at Delphi (c. 525 BC), and a late fifth century BC cup from Vulci (Berlin F2531) shown fighting Ares.

== Namesake ==
In 1847, the mythological Giant inspired the name of the closest major moon to Saturn.

== See also ==
- Alcyoneus
- Aristaeus
- Picolous
- Polybotes
