= Meropis (Greek poem) =

Ancient Greek poem by an unknown author

- Original title: ΜΕΡΟΠΙΣ
- Written: c. 6th century BC
- Country: Ancient Greece
- Language: Ancient Greek

Meropis (Ancient Greek: ΜΕΡΟΠΙΣ) is an Ancient Greek epic poem of unknown authorship from c. sixth century BC, known only from fragments and references. The fragments describe Heracles among the Meropes, a battle with the giant Asteron, and how the goddess Athena intervenes to aid Hercules. The use of ambrosia in this poem recalls a similar episode in the Odyssey. The episode in which Athena skins Asteron evokes the analogous episode involving Pallas, as described by Pseudo-Apollodorus.

== Synopsis ==
The fragments describe Heracles among the Meropes; arrows repeatedly fail to wound a giant named Asteron. Athena descends from the clouds, strips Asteron's hide, and sprinkles it with ambrosia, apparently preparing it for further use.
