= Pallas (Giant) =

Son of Uranus and Gaia, killed and flayed by Athena

In Greek mythology, Pallas (/ˈpæləs/ PAL-əs; Ancient Greek: Πάλλας) was one of the Gigantes (Giants), the offspring of Gaia, born from the blood of the castrated Uranus. According to the mythographer Apollodorus, during the Gigantomachy, the cosmic battle of the Giants with the Olympian gods, he was flayed by Athena, who used his skin as a shield.

== Mythology ==
Though the origin of Athena's epithet "Pallas" is obscure, according to a fragment from an unidentified play of Epicharmus (between c. 540 and c. 450 BC), Athena, after having used his skin for her cloak, took her name from the Giant Pallas.

This story, related by Apollodorus and Epicharmus, is one of a number of stories in which Athena kills and flays an opponent, with its hide becoming her aegis. For example, Euripides tells that during "the battle the giants fought against the gods in Phlegra" that it was "the Gorgon" (possibly considered here to be one of the Giants) that Athena killed and flayed, while the epic poem Meropis, has Athena kill and flay the Giant Asterus, using his impenetrable skin for her aegis. Another of these flayed adversaries, also named Pallas, was said to be the father of Athena, who had tried to rape her.

The late 4th century AD Latin poet Claudian in his Gigantomachia, has Pallas, as one of several Giants turned to stone by Minerva's Gorgon shield, calling out "What is happening to me? What is this ice that creeps o're all my limbs? What is this numbness that holds me prisoner in these marble fetters?" Then his brother Damastor uses his petrified body as a weapon and hurls him at the gods.

Pallas was also the name of a Titan, with whom the Giant is sometimes confused or identified.

== Cult and regional significance ==
Pallas is primarily associated with Attic myth, where he appears as a giant who clashed with the Olympian gods. According to Pausanias, local traditions linked Pallas to the region of Pallene, suggesting that his myth was incorporated into cultic and geographic memory in Attica. Some scholars have proposed that Pallas was connected to ritual dances or martial displays, such as the female pyrrhic dance performed in honor of Athena, reflecting a symbolic integration of myth and civic religion.

Older scholarship, such as Farnell's Greek Hero Cults and Ideas of Immortality, treats Pallas within a broader framework of giants and hero cults, showing how early Greek authors conceptualized pre-Olympian beings as part of ritual and mythic tradition.

== See also ==
- Alcyoneus
- Athos
- Picolous
