= Aristaeus (disambiguation) =

Aristaeus was a figure in Greek mythology.

Aristaeus may also refer to:

- Aristaeus the Elder, Greek mathematician, active in the 4th century BCE
- Aristaeus, another name for Battus I of Cyrene, founder of the colony of Cyrene
- 2135 Aristaeus, an Apollo asteroid
- Aristaeus (giant), one of the giants in Greek mythology
