= Gration =

Gration is a surname. Notable people with the surname include:

- Barry Gration (born 1936), Royal Australian Air Force officer
- Harry Gration (1950–2022), English journalist and broadcaster
- Peter Gration (born 1932), Australian Army officer
- Scott Gration (born 1951), American diplomat and retired Air Force officer

== See also ==
- Gration (Γρατίων), one of the Giants in Greek mythology
