= Giants (Greek mythology) =

Giants from Greek myth

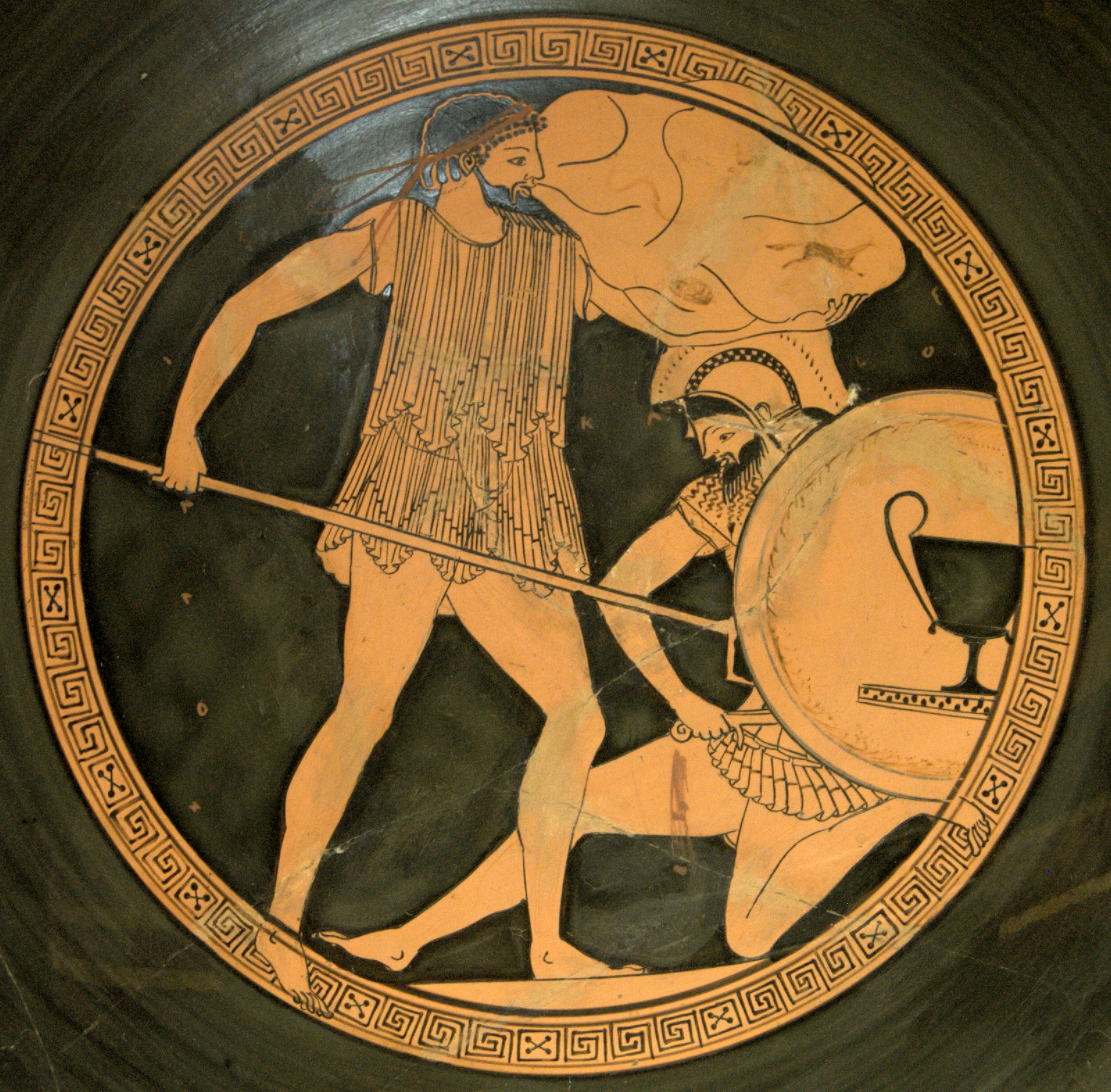
Poseidon (left) holding a trident, with the island Nisyros on his shoulder, battling a Giant (probably Polybotes), red-figure cup c. 500–450 BC (Cabinet des Médailles 573)

In Greek and Roman mythology, the Giants, also called Gigantes (Greek: Γίγαντες, Gígantes, singular: Γίγας, Gígas), were a race of great strength and aggression, though not necessarily of great size, known for the Gigantomachy (also spelled Gigantomachia), their battle with the Olympian gods. According to Hesiod, the Giants were the offspring of Gaia (Earth), born from the blood that fell when Uranus (Sky) was castrated by his Titan son Cronus.

Archaic and Classical representations show Gigantes as man-sized hoplites (heavily armed ancient Greek foot soldiers) fully human in form. Later representations (after c. 380 BC) show Gigantes with snakes for legs. In later traditions, the Giants were often confused with other opponents of the Olympians, particularly the Titans, an earlier generation of large and powerful children of Gaia and Uranus.

The vanquished Giants were said to be buried under volcanoes and to be the cause of volcanic eruptions and earthquakes.

== Origins ==
The name "Gigantes" is usually taken to imply "earth-born", and Hesiod's Theogony makes this explicit by having the Giants be the offspring of Gaia (Earth). According to Hesiod, Gaia, mating with Uranus, bore many children: the first generation of Titans, the Cyclopes, and the Hundred-Handers. However, Uranus hated his children and, as soon as they were born, he imprisoned them inside Gaia, causing her much distress. Therefore, Gaia made a sickle of adamant which she gave to Cronus, the youngest of her Titan sons, and hid him (presumably still inside Gaia's body) to wait in ambush. When Uranus came to lie with Gaia, Cronus castrated his father, and "the bloody drops that gushed forth [Gaia] received, and as the seasons moved round she bore ... the great Giants." From these same drops of blood also came the Erinyes (Furies) and the Meliai (ash tree nymphs), while the severed genitals of Uranus falling into the sea resulted in a white foam from which Aphrodite grew. The mythographer Apollodorus also has the Giants being the offspring of Gaia and Uranus, though he makes no connection with Uranus' castration, saying simply that Gaia "vexed on account of the Titans, brought forth the Giants".

There are three brief references to the Gigantes in Homer's Odyssey, though it is not entirely clear that Homer and Hesiod understood the term to mean the same thing. Homer has Giants among the ancestors of the Phaiakians, a race of men encountered by Odysseus, their ruler Alcinous being the son of Nausithous, who was the son of Poseidon and Periboea, the daughter of the Giant king Eurymedon. Elsewhere in the Odyssey, Alcinous says that the Phaiakians, like the Cyclopes and the Giants, are "near kin" to the gods. Odysseus describes the Laestrygonians (another race encountered by Odysseus in his travels) as more like Giants than men. Pausanias, the 2nd century AD geographer, read these lines of the Odyssey to mean that, for Homer, the Giants were a race of mortal men.

The 6th–5th century BC lyric poet Bacchylides calls the Giants "sons of the Earth". Later the term "gegeneis" ("earthborn") became a common epithet of the Giants. The first century Latin writer Hyginus has the Giants being the offspring of Gaia and Tartarus, another primordial Greek deity.

== Confusion with Titans and others ==
Though distinct in early traditions, Hellenistic and later writers often confused or conflated the Giants and their Gigantomachy with an earlier set of offspring of Gaia and Uranus, the Titans and their war with the Olympian gods, the Titanomachy. This confusion extended to other opponents of the Olympians, including the huge monster Typhon, the offspring of Gaia and Tartarus, whom Zeus finally defeated with his thunderbolt, and the Aloadae, the large, strong and aggressive brothers Otus and Ephialtes, who piled Pelion on top of Ossa in order to scale the heavens and attack the Olympians (though in the case of Ephialtes there was probably a Giant with the same name). For example, Hyginus includes the names of three Titans, Coeus, Iapetus, and Astraeus, along with Typhon and the Aloadae, in his list of Giants, and Ovid seems to conflate the Gigantomachy with the later siege of Olympus by the Aloadae.

Ovid also seems to confuse the Hundred-Handers with the Giants, whom he gives a "hundred arms". So perhaps do Callimachus and Philostratus, since they both make Aegaeon the cause of earthquakes, as was often said about the Giants (see below).

== Descriptions ==
Homer describes the Giant king Eurymedon as "great-hearted" (μεγαλήτορος), and his people as "insolent" (ὑπερθύμοισι) and "froward" (ἀτάσθαλος). Hesiod calls the Giants "strong" (κρατερῶν) and "great" (μεγάλους) which may or may not be a reference to their size. Though a possible later addition, the Theogony also has the Giants born "with gleaming armour, holding long spears in their hands".

Other early sources characterize the Giants by their excesses. Pindar describes the excessive violence of the Giant Porphyrion as having provoked "beyond all measure". Bacchylides calls the Giants arrogant, saying that they were destroyed by "Hybris" (the Greek word hubris personified). The earlier seventh century BC poet Alcman perhaps had already used the Giants as an example of hubris, with the phrases "vengeance of the gods" and "they suffered unforgettable punishments for the evil they did" being possible references to the Gigantomachy.

Homer's comparison of the Giants to the Laestrygonians is suggestive of similarities between the two races. The Laestrygonians, who "hurled ... rocks huge as a man could lift", certainly possessed great strength, and possibly great size, as their king's wife is described as being as big as a mountain.

Over time, descriptions of the Giants make them less human, more monstrous and more "gigantic". According to Apollodorus the Giants had great size and strength, a frightening appearance, with long hair and beards and scaly feet. Ovid makes them "serpent-footed" with a "hundred arms", and Nonnus has them "serpent-haired".

== The Gigantomachy ==
The most important divine struggle in Greek mythology was the Gigantomachy, the battle fought between the Giants and the Olympian gods for supremacy of the cosmos. It is primarily for this battle that the Giants are known, and its importance to Greek culture is attested by the frequent depiction of the Gigantomachy in Greek art.

=== Early sources ===
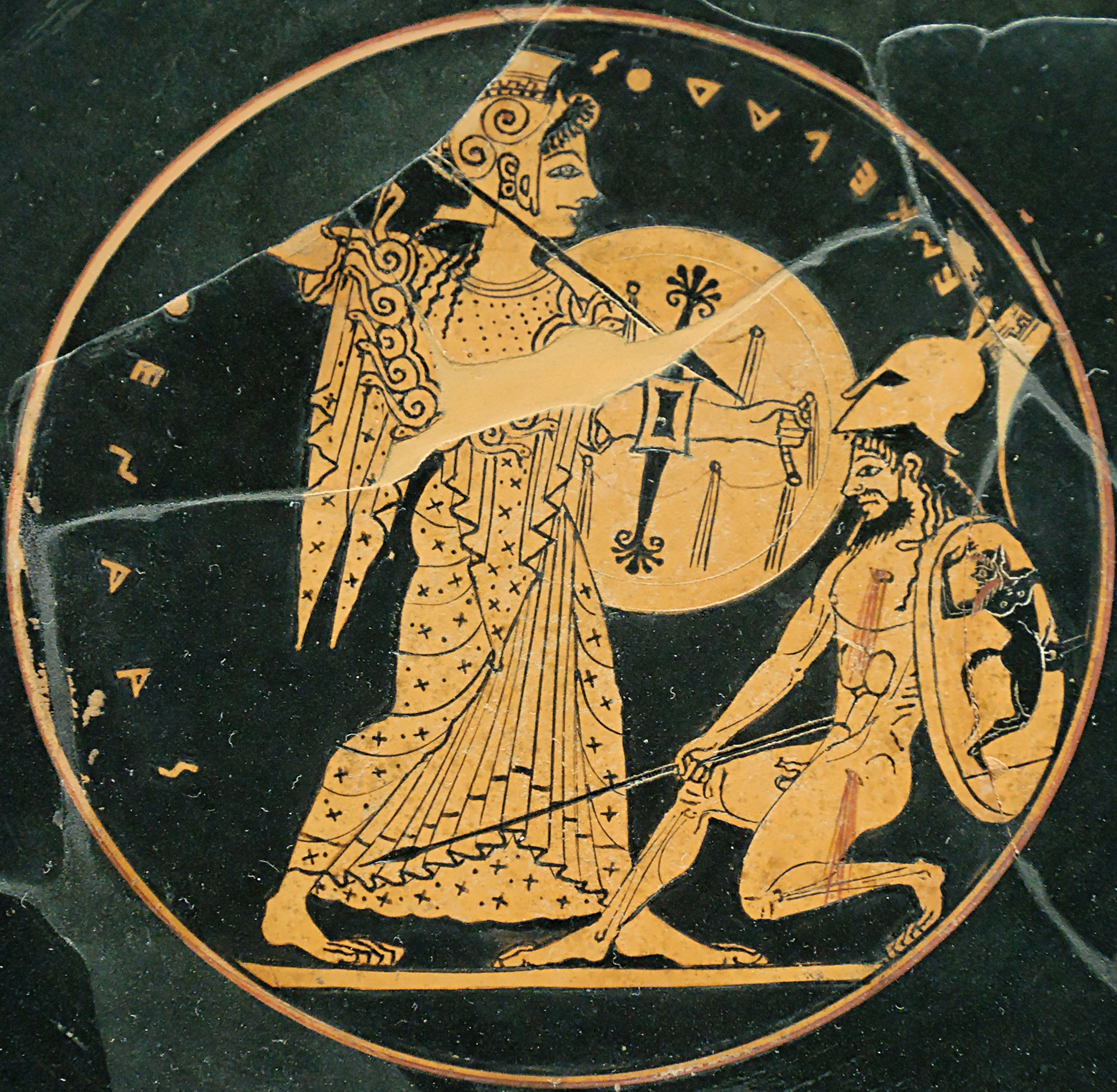
Athena (left) fighting the Giant Enceladus (inscribed retrograde) on an Attic red-figure dish, c. 550–500 BC (Louvre CA3662).

The references to the Gigantomachy in archaic sources are sparse. Neither Homer nor Hesiod mention anything explicit about the Giants battling the gods. Homer's remark that Eurymedon "brought destruction on his froward people" might possibly be a reference to the Gigantomachy and Hesiod's remark that Heracles performed a "great work among the immortals" is probably a reference to Heracles' crucial role in the gods' victory over the Giants. The Hesiodic Catalogue of Women (also called Ehoiai), following mentions of Heracles' sacks of Troy and of Kos, refers to his having slain "presumptuous Giants". Another probable reference to the Gigantomachy in the Catalogue has Zeus produce Heracles to be "a protector against ruin for gods and men".

There are indications that there might have been a lost epic poem, a Gigantomachia, which gave an account of the war: Hesiod's Theogony says that the Muses sing of the Giants, and the sixth century BC poet Xenophanes mentions the Gigantomachy as a subject to be avoided at table. The Apollonius scholia refers to a "Gigantomachia" in which the Titan Cronus (as a horse) sires the centaur Chiron by mating with Philyra (the daughter of two Titans), but the scholiast may be confusing the Titans and Giants. Other possible archaic sources include the lyric poets Alcman (mentioned above) and the sixth-century Ibycus.

The late sixth early fifth century BC lyric poet Pindar provides some of the earliest details of the battle between the Giants and the Olympians. He locates it "on the plain of Phlegra" and has Teiresias foretell Heracles killing Giants "beneath [his] rushing arrows". He calls Heracles "you who subdued the Giants", and has Porphyrion, whom he calls "the king of the Giants", being overcome by the bow of Apollo. Euripides' Heracles has its hero shooting Giants with arrows, and his Ion has the chorus describe seeing a depiction of the Gigantomachy on the late sixth century Temple of Apollo at Delphi, with Athena fighting the Giant Enceladus with her "gorgon shield", Zeus burning the Giant Mimas with his "mighty thunderbolt, blazing at both ends", and Dionysus killing an unnamed Giant with his "ivy staff". The early 3rd century BC author Apollonius of Rhodes briefly describes an incident where the sun god Helios takes up Hephaestus, exhausted from the fight in Phlegra, on his chariot.

=== Apollodorus ===
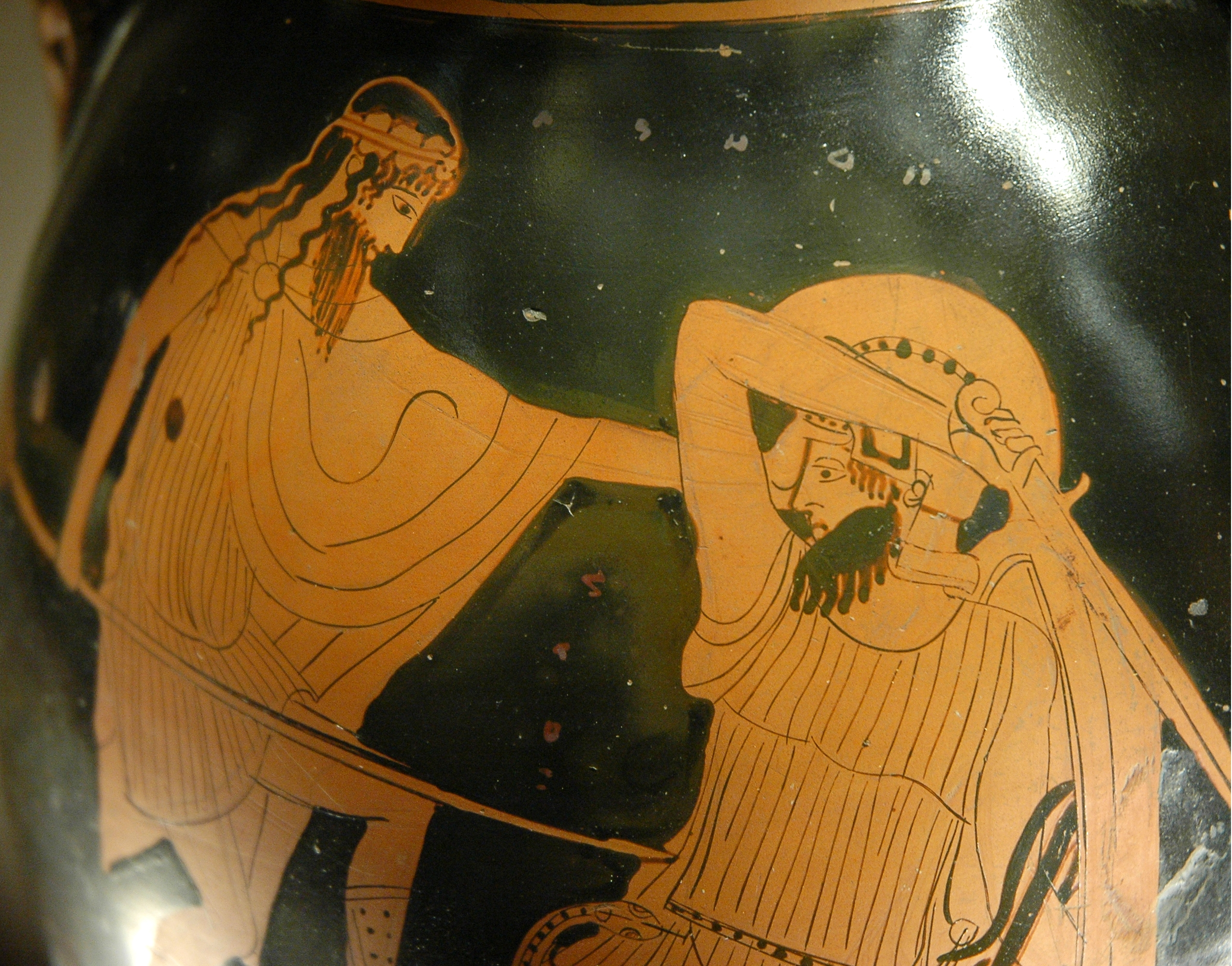
Dionysus (left) with ivy crown, and thyrsus attacking a Giant, Attic red-figure pelike, c. 475–425 BC (Louvre G434).

The most detailed account of the Gigantomachy is that of the (first or second-century AD) mythographer Apollodorus. None of the early sources give any reasons for the war. Scholia to the Iliad mention the rape of Hera by the Giant Eurymedon, while according to the scholia to Pindar's Isthmian 6, it was the theft of the cattle of Helios by the Giant Alcyoneus that started the war. Apollodorus, who also mentions the theft of Helios' cattle by Alcyoneus, suggests a mother's revenge as the motive for the war, saying that Gaia bore the Giants because of her anger over the Titans (who had been vanquished and imprisoned by the Olympians). Seemingly, as soon as the Giants are born they begin hurling "rocks and burning oaks at the sky".

There was a prophecy that the Giants could not be killed by the gods alone, but they could be killed with the help of a mortal. Hearing this, Gaia sought for a certain plant (pharmakon) that would protect the Giants. Before Gaia or anyone else could find this plant, Zeus forbade Eos (Dawn), Selene (Moon) and Helios (Sun) to shine, harvested all of the plant himself and then he had Athena summon Heracles.

According to Apollodorus, Alcyoneus and Porphyrion were the two strongest Giants. Heracles shot Alcyoneus, who fell to the ground but then revived, for Alcyoneus was immortal within his native land. So Heracles, on Athena's advice, dragged him beyond the borders of that land, where Alcyoneus then died (compare with Antaeus). Porphyrion attacked Heracles and Hera, but Zeus caused Porphyrion to become enamoured of Hera, whom Porphyrion then tried to rape, but Zeus struck Porphyrion with his thunderbolt and Heracles killed him with an arrow.

Other Giants and their fates are mentioned by Apollodorus. Ephialtes was blinded by an arrow from Apollo in his left eye, and another arrow from Heracles in his right. Eurytus was killed by Dionysus with his thyrsus, Clytius by Hecate with her torches, and Mimas by Hephaestus with "missiles of red-hot metal" from his forge. Athena crushed Enceladus under the Island of Sicily and flayed Pallas, using his skin as a shield. Poseidon broke off a piece of the island of Kos called Nisyros, and threw it on top of Polybotes (Strabo also relates the story of Polybotes buried under Nisyros but adds that some say Polybotes lies under Kos instead). Hermes, wearing Hades' helmet, killed Hippolytus, Artemis killed Gration with her bow and arrows, and the Moirai killed Agrius and Thoas with bronze clubs. The rest of the giants were "destroyed" by thunderbolts thrown by Zeus, with each Giant being shot with arrows by Heracles (as the prophecy seemingly required).

=== Ovid ===
The Latin poet Ovid gives a brief account of the Gigantomachy in his poem Metamorphoses. Ovid, apparently including the Aloadae's attack upon Olympus as part of the Gigantomachy, has the Giants attempt to seize "the throne of Heaven" by piling "mountain on mountain to the lofty stars" but Jove (i.e. Jupiter, the Roman Zeus) overwhelms the Giants with his thunderbolts, overturning "from Ossa huge, enormous Pelion". Ovid says that (as "fame reports") from the blood of the Giants came a new race of beings in human form. According to Ovid, Earth (Gaia) did not want the Giants to perish without a trace, so "reeking with the copious blood of her gigantic sons", she gave life to the "steaming gore" of the blood soaked battleground. These new offspring, like their fathers the Giants, also hated the gods and possessed a bloodthirsty desire for "savage slaughter".

Later in the Metamorphoses, Ovid refers to the Gigantomachy as: "The time when serpent footed giants strove / to fix their hundred arms on captive Heaven". Here Ovid apparently conflates the Giants with the Hundred-Handers, who, though in Hesiod fought alongside Zeus and the Olympians, in some traditions fought against them.

=== Other late sources ===
Eratosthenes records that Dionysus, Hephaestus and several satyrs mounted on donkeys and charged against the Giants. As they drew closer and before the Giants had spotted them, the donkeys brayed, scaring off some Giants who ran away in terror of the unseen enemies, for they had never heard a donkey's bray before. Dionysus placed the donkeys in the skies in gratitude, and in vase paintings from the classical period, satyrs and Maenads can sometimes be seen confronting their gigantic opponents.

A late Latin grammarian of the fifth century AD, Servius, mentions that during the battle, the eagle of Zeus (who once had been the boy Aëtos before his metamorphosis) assisted his master by placing the lightning bolts on his hands.

=== Location ===
Various places have been associated with the Giants and the Gigantomachy. As noted above Pindar has the battle occur at Phlegra ("the place of burning"), as do other early sources. Phlegra was said to be an ancient name for Pallene (modern Kassandra) and Phlegra/Pallene was the usual birthplace of the Giants and site of the battle. Apollodorus, who placed the battle at Pallene, says the Giants were born "as some say, in Phlegrae, but according to others in Pallene". The name Phlegra and the Gigantomachy were also often associated, by later writers, with a volcanic plain in Italy, west of Naples and east of Cumae, called the Phlegraean Fields. The third century BC poet Lycophron, apparently locates a battle of gods and Giants in the vicinity of the volcanic island of Ischia, the largest of the Phlegraean Islands off the coast of Naples, where he says the Giants (along with Typhon) were "crushed" under the island. At least one tradition placed Phlegra in Thessaly.

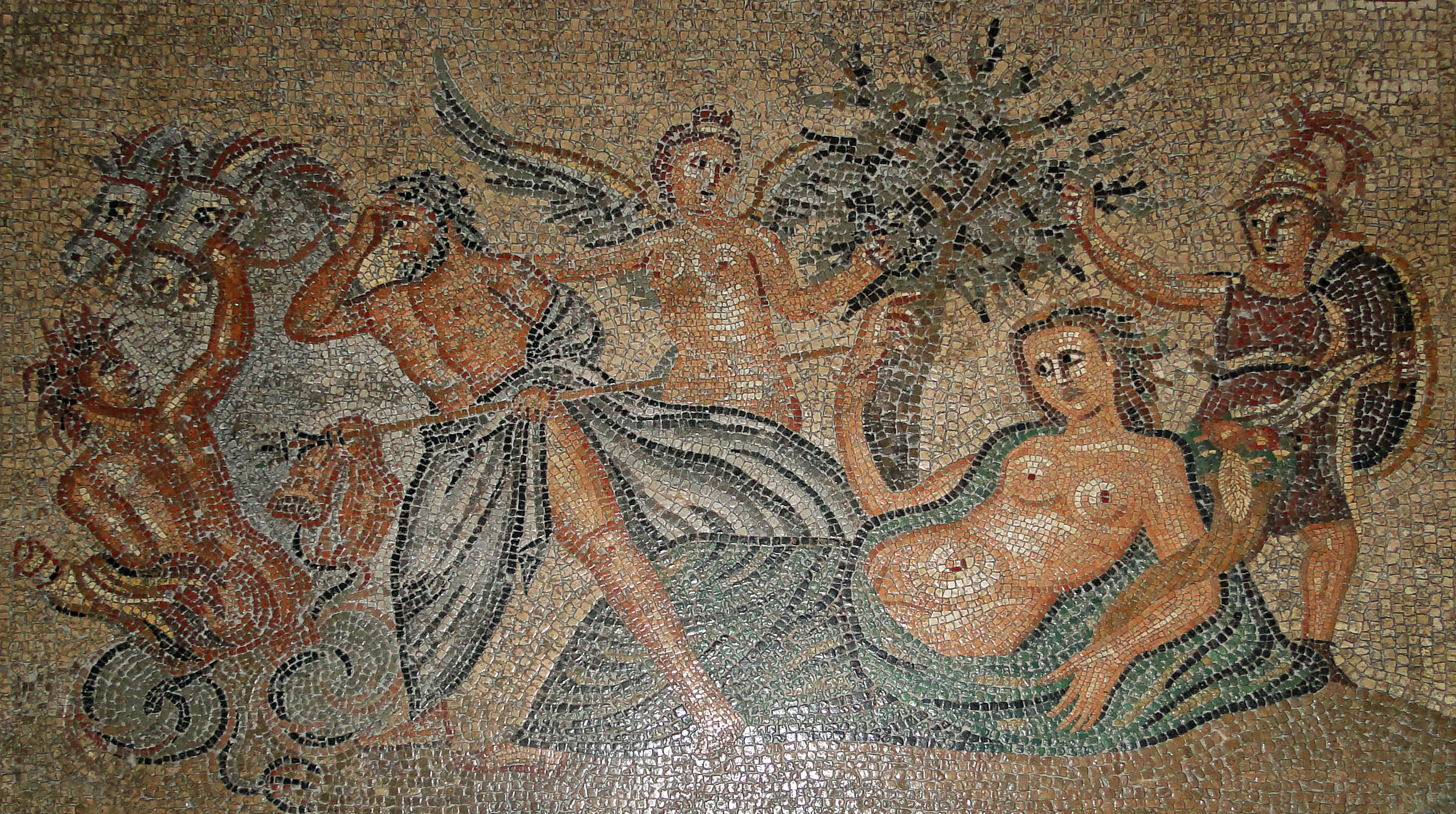
Ancient Roman mosaic with Poseidon fighting Polybotes, exhibited in Rhodes.

According to the geographer Pausanias, the Arcadians claimed that battle took place "not at Pellene in Thrace" but in the plain of Megalopolis in the central Peloponnese where "rises up fire". The tradition of the battle being in Megalopolis may have been inspired by the presence of numerous gigantic bones around Megalopolis as noted by Pausanias, which in Ancient Greek times were attributed to giants, but which in modern times are known to be those of fossil Pleistocene mammals such as straight-tusked elephants, an enormous extinct elephant species formerly native to the region. Another tradition apparently placed the battle at Tartessus in Spain. Diodorus Siculus presents a war with multiple battles, with one at Pallene, one on the Phlegraean Fields, and one on Crete. Strabo mentions an account of Heracles battling Giants at Phanagoria, a Greek colony on the shores of the Black Sea. Even when, as in Apollodorus, the battle starts at one place. Individual battles between a Giant and a god might range farther afield, with Enceladus buried beneath Sicily, and Polybotes under the island of Nisyros (or Kos). Other locales associated with Giants include Attica, Corinth, Cyzicus, Lipara, Lycia, Lydia, Miletus, and Rhodes.

The presence of volcanic phenomena, and the frequent unearthing of the fossilized bones of large prehistoric animals throughout these locations may explain why such sites became associated with the Giants.

=== In art ===
==== Sixth century BC ====
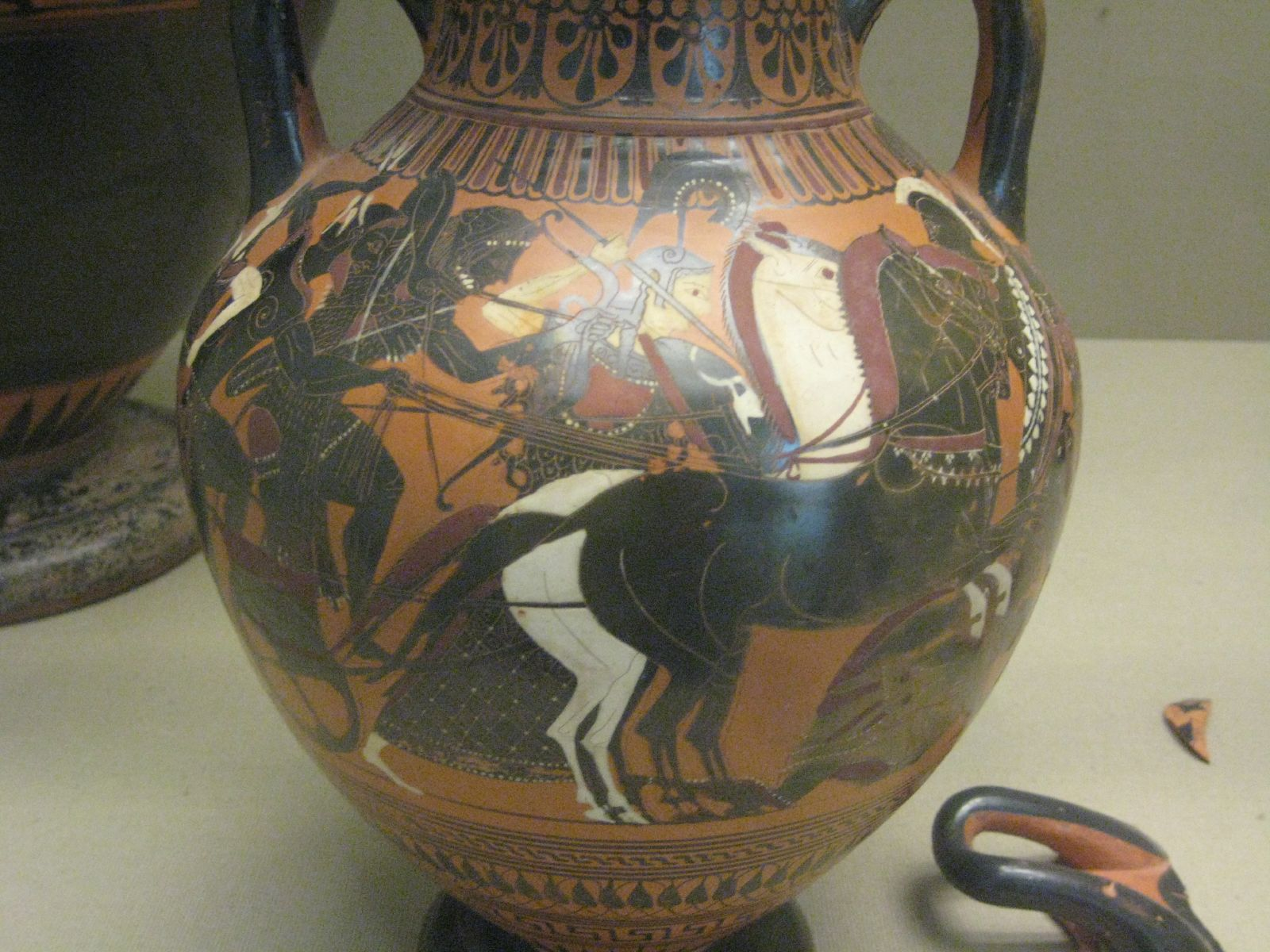
A depiction of the Gigantomachy showing a typical central group of Zeus, Heracles and Athena. black-figure amphora in the style of the Lysippides Painter, c. 530-520 BC (British Museum B208).

From the sixth century BC onwards, the Gigantomachy was a popular and important theme in Greek art, with over six hundred representations cataloged in the Lexicon Iconographicum Mythologiae Classicae (LIMC).

The Gigantomachy was depicted on the new peplos (robe) presented to Athena on the Acropolis of Athens as part of the Panathenaic festival celebrating her victory over the Giants, a practice dating from perhaps as early as the second millennium BC. The earliest extant indisputable representations of Gigantes are found on votive pinakes from Corinth and Eleusis, and Attic black-figure pots, dating from the second quarter of the sixth century BC (this excludes early depictions of Zeus battling single snake-footed creatures, which probably represent his battle with Typhon, as well as Zeus' opponent on the west pediment of the Temple of Artemis on Kerkyra (modern Corfu) which is probably not a Giant).

Though all these early Attic vases are fragmentary, the many common features in their depictions of the Gigantomachy suggest that a common model or template was used as a prototype, possibly Athena's peplos. These vases depict large battles, including most of the Olympians, and contain a central group which appears to consist of Zeus, Heracles, Athena, and sometimes Gaia. Zeus, Heracles and Athena are attacking Giants to the right. Zeus mounts a chariot brandishing his thunderbolt in his right hand, Heracles, in the chariot, bends forward with drawn bow and left foot on the chariot pole, Athena, beside the chariot, strides forward toward one or two Giants, and the four chariot horses trample a fallen Giant. When present, Gaia is shielded behind Herakles, apparently pleading with Zeus to spare her children.

On either side of the central group are the rest of the gods engaged in combat with particular Giants. While the gods can be identified by characteristic features, for example Hermes with his hat (petasos) and Dionysus his ivy crown, the Giants are not individually characterized and can only be identified by inscriptions which sometimes name the Giant. The fragments of one vase from this same period (Getty 81.AE.211) name five Giants: Pankrates against Heracles, Polybotes against Zeus, Oranion against Dionysus, Euboios and Euphorbus fallen and Ephialtes. Also named, on two other of these early vases, are Aristaeus battling Hephaestus (Akropolis 607), Eurymedon and (again) Ephialtes (Akropolis 2134). An amphora from Caere from later in the sixth century, gives the names of more Giants: Hyperbios and Agasthenes (along with Ephialtes) fighting Zeus, Harpolykos against Hera, Enceladus against Athena and (again) Polybotes, who in this case battles Poseidon with his trident holding the island of Nisyros on his shoulder (Louvre E732). This motif of Poseidon holding the island of Nisyros, ready to hurl it at his opponent, is another frequent feature of these early Gigantomachies.

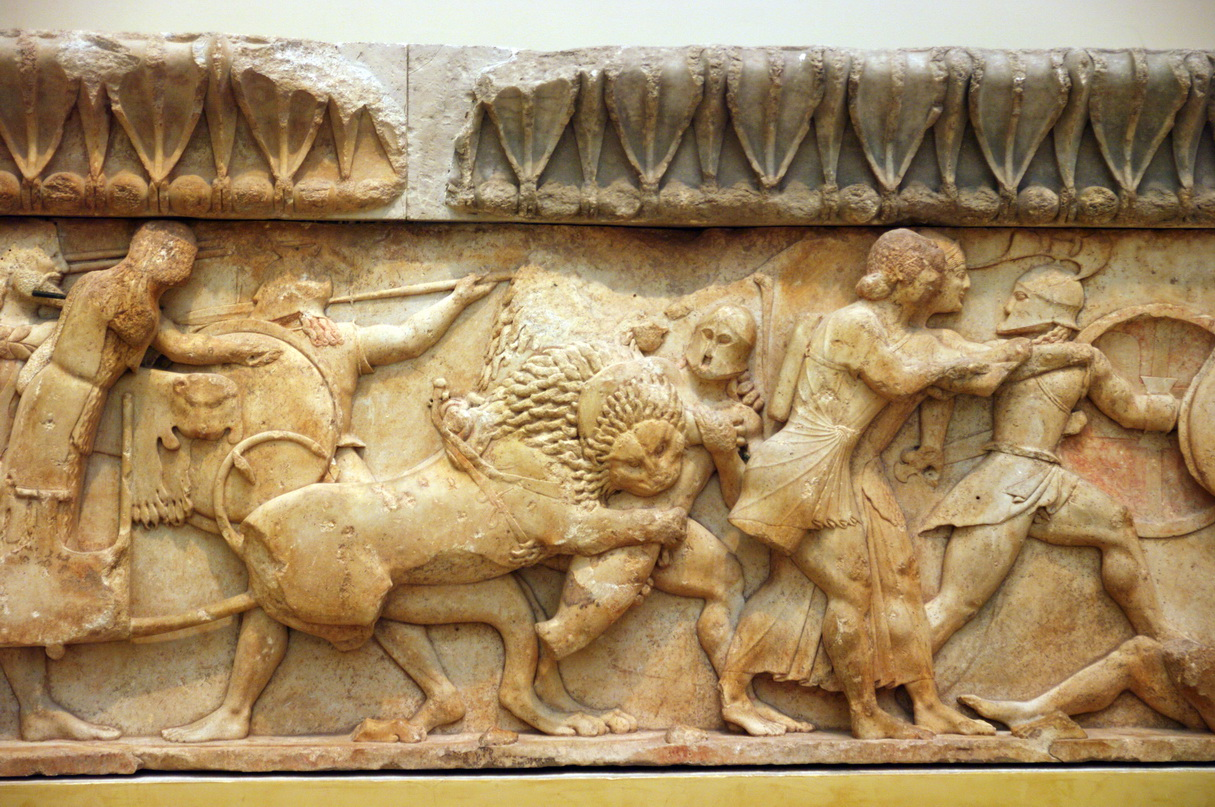
Siphnian Treasury at Delphi, North frieze (c. 525 BC). Detail showing gods facing right and Giants facing left.

The Gigantomachy was also a popular theme in late sixth century sculpture. The most comprehensive treatment is found on the north frieze of the Siphnian Treasury at Delphi (c. 525 BC), with more than thirty figures, named by inscription. From left to right, these include Hephaestus (with bellows), two females fighting two Giants; Dionysus striding toward an advancing Giant; Themis in a chariot drawn by a team of lions which are attacking a fleeing Giant; the archers Apollo and Artemis; another fleeing Giant (Tharos or possibly Kantharos); the Giant Ephialtes lying on the ground; and a group of three Giants, which include Hyperphas and Alektos, opposing Apollo and Artemis. Next comes a missing central section presumably containing Zeus, and possibly Heracles, with chariot (only parts of a team of horses remain). To the right of this comes a female stabbing her spear at a fallen Giant (probably Porphyrion); Athena fighting Eriktypos and a second Giant; a male stepping over the fallen Astarias to attack Biatas. and another Giant; and Hermes against two Giants. Then follows a gap which probably contained Poseidon and finally, on the far right, a male fighting two Giants, one fallen, the other the Giant Mimon (possibly the same as the Giant Mimas mentioned by Apollodorus).

The Gigantomachy also appeared on several other late sixth century buildings, including the west pediment of the Alkmeonid Temple of Apollo at Delphi, the pediment of the Megarian Treasury at Olympia, the east pediment of the Old Temple of Athena on the Acropolis of Athens, and the metopes of Temple F at Selinous.

==== Fifth century BC ====
The theme continued to be popular in the fifth century BC. A particularly fine example is found on a red-figure cup (c. 490–485 BC) by the Brygos Painter (Berlin F2293). On one side of the cup is the same central group of gods (minus Gaia) as described above: Zeus wielding his thunderbolt, stepping into a quadriga, Heracles with lion skin (behind the chariot rather than on it) drawing his (unseen) bow and, ahead, Athena thrusting her spear into a fallen Giant. On the other side are Hephaestus flinging flaming missiles of red-hot metal from two pairs of tongs, Poseidon, with Nisyros on his shoulder, stabbing a fallen Giant with his trident and Hermes with his petasos hanging in back of his head, attacking another fallen Giant. None of the Giants are named.

Phidias used the theme for the metopes of the east façade of the Parthenon (c. 445 BC) and for the interior of the shield of Athena Parthenos. Phidias' work perhaps marks the beginning of a change in the way the Giants are presented. While previously the Giants had been portrayed as typical hoplite warriors armed with the usual helmets, shields, spears and swords, in the fifth century the Giants begin to be depicted as less handsome in appearance, primitive and wild, clothed in animal skins or naked, often without armor and using boulders as weapons. A series of red-figure pots from c. 400 BC, which may have used Phidas' shield of Athena Parthenos as their model, show the Olympians fighting from above and the Giants fighting with large stones from below.

==== Fourth century BC and later ====
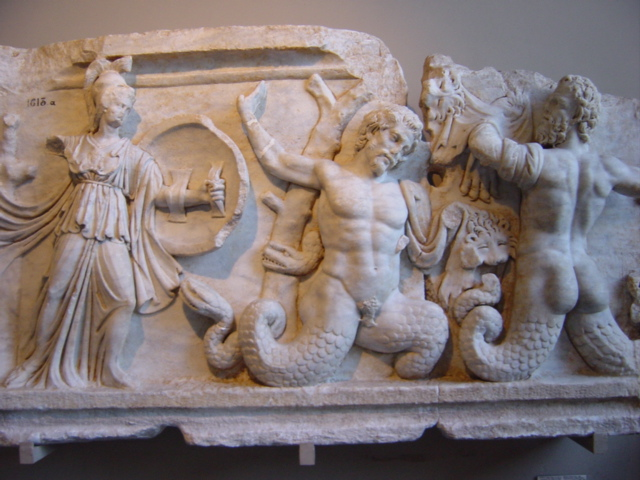
In the Gigantomachy from a 1st-century AD frieze in the agora of Aphrodisias, the Giants are depicted with scaly coils, like Typhon

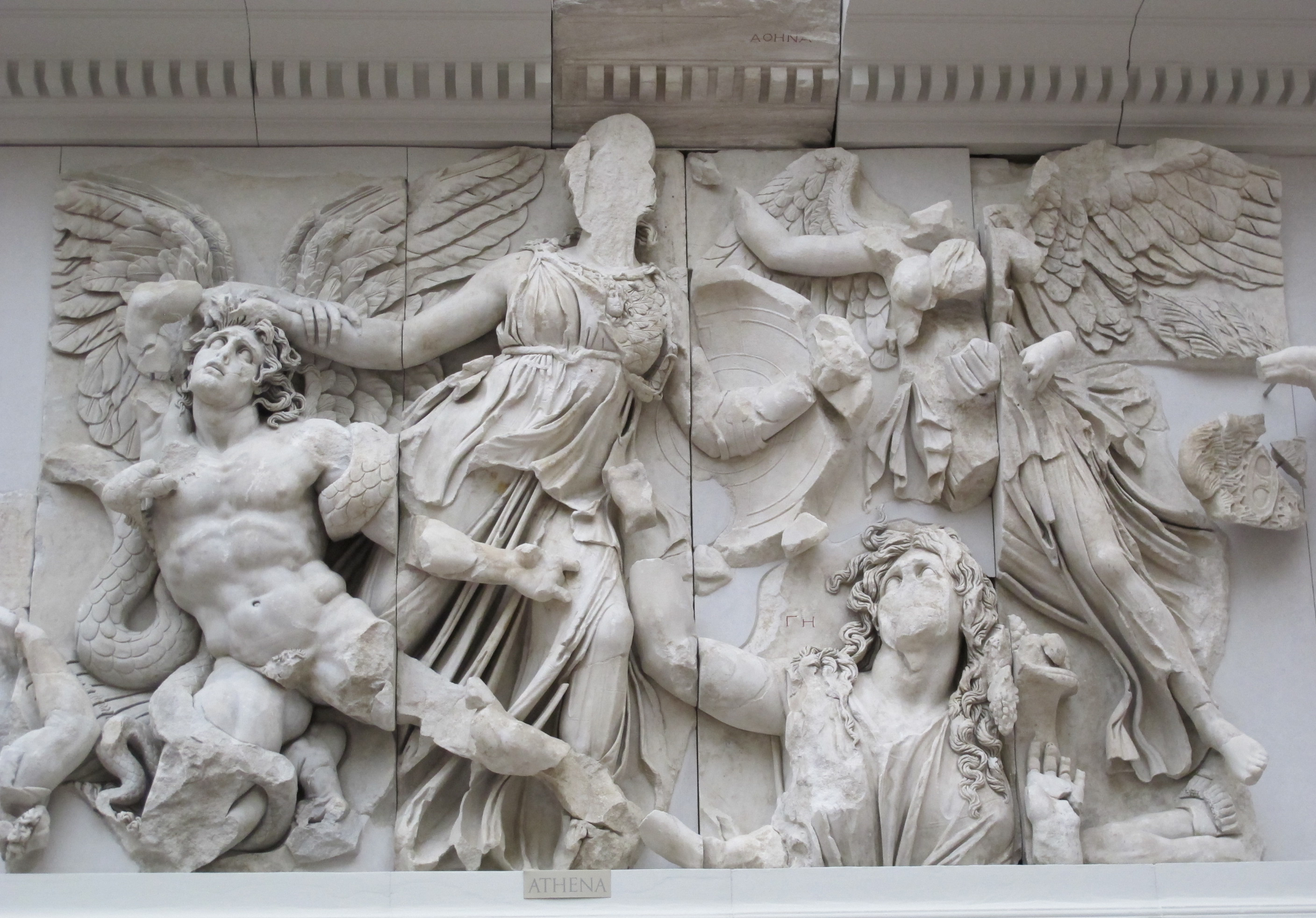
Winged Giant (usually identified as Alcyoneus), Athena, Gaia (rising from the ground), and Nike, detail of the Gigantomachy frieze, Pergamon Altar, Pergamon museum, Berlin

With the beginning of the fourth century BC probably comes the first portrayal of the Giants in Greek art as anything other than fully human in form, with legs that become coiled serpents having snake heads at the ends in place of feet. Such depictions were perhaps borrowed from Typhon, the monstrous son of Gaia and Tartarus, described by Hesiod as having a hundred snake heads growing from his shoulders. This snake-legged motif becomes the standard for the rest of antiquity, culminating in the monumental Gigantomachy frieze of the second century BC Pergamon Altar. Measuring nearly 400 feet long and over seven feet high, here the Gigantomachy receives its most extensive treatment, with over one hundred figures.

Although fragmentary, much of the Gigantomachy frieze has been restored. The general sequence of the figures and the identifications of most of the approximately sixty gods and goddesses have been more or less established. The names and positions of most Giants remain uncertain. Some of the names of the Giants have been determined by inscription, while their positions are often conjectured on the basis of which gods fought which Giants in Apollodorus' account.

The same central group of Zeus, Athena, Heracles and Gaia, found on many early Attic vases, also featured prominently on the Pergamon Altar. On the right side of the East frieze, the first encountered by a visitor, a winged Giant, usually identified as Alcyoneus, fights Athena. Below and to the right of Athena, Gaia rises from the ground, touching Athena's robe in supplication. Flying above Gaia, a winged Nike crowns the victorious Athena. To the left of this grouping a snake-legged Porphyrion battles Zeus and to the left of Zeus is Heracles.

On the far left side of the East frieze, a triple Hecate with torch battles a snake-legged Giant usually identified (following Apollodorus) as Clytius. To the right lays the fallen Udaeus, shot in his left eye by an arrow from Apollo, along with Demeter who wields a pair of torches against Erysichthon.

The Giants are depicted in a variety of ways. Some Giants are fully human in form, while others are a combination of human and animal forms. Some are snake-legged, some have wings, one has bird claws, one is lion-headed, and another is bull-headed. Some Giants wear helmets, carry shields and fight with swords. Others are naked or clothed in animal skins and fight with clubs or rocks.

The large size of the frieze probably necessitated the addition of many more Giants than had been previously known. Some, like Typhon and Tityus, who were not strictly speaking Giants, were perhaps included. Others were probably invented. The partial inscription "Mim" may mean that the Giant Mimas was also depicted. Other less-familiar or otherwise unknown Giant names include Allektos, Chthonophylos, Eurybias, Molodros, Obrimos, Ochthaios and Olyktor.

The Gigantomachy was a popular subject in Etruscan art, particularly mirrors depicting the war gods Laran (the Etruscan counterpart to Ares) and Menrva (Athena). Giants named in these mirrors include Celsclan ("son of Cel," Etruscan counterpart of Gaia), who was felled by Laran with a sword, and Akrathe, felled by Menrva. A popular and exclusively-Etruscan image of the Gigantomachy is Menrva beating a Giant with his own arm, which she has torn from his body, while preparing to finish him off with a spear thrust with her other hand; in addition to mirrors this image recurs on small personal items such as water jars, wine jars, gems, and small reliefs decorating household boxes, among other places.

==== In post-classical art ====
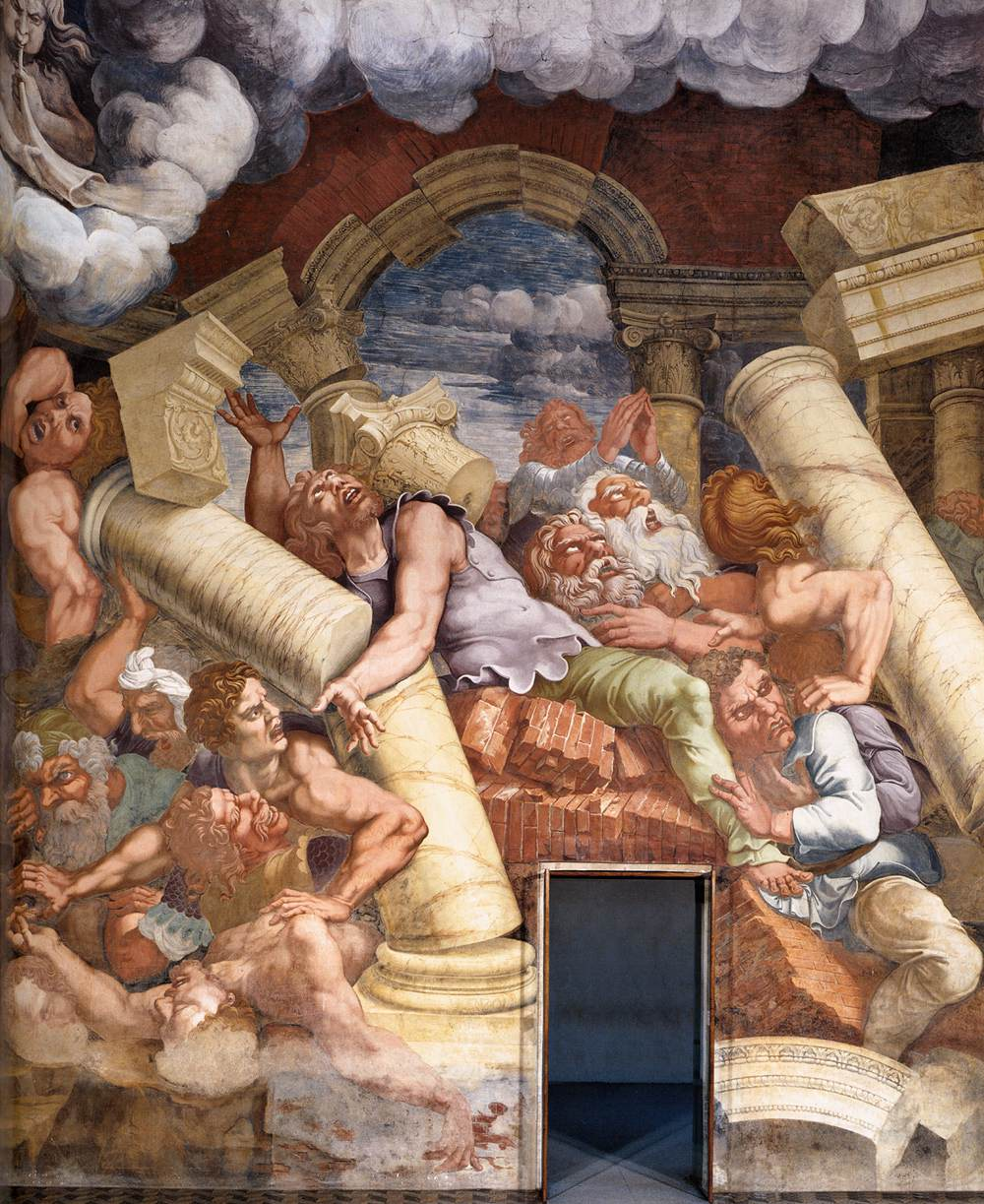
Detail of the Sala dei Giganti in the Palazzo del Te, Mantua, c. 1530, Giulio Romano

The subject was revived in the Renaissance, most famously in the frescos of the Sala dei Giganti in the Palazzo del Te, Mantua. These were painted around 1530 by Giulio Romano and his workshop, and aimed to give the viewer the unsettling idea that the large hall was in the process of collapsing. The subject was also popular in Northern Mannerism around 1600, especially among the Haarlem Mannerists, and continued to be painted into the 18th century.

== Symbolism, meaning and interpretations ==
Historically, the myth of the Gigantomachy (as well as the Titanomachy) may reflect the "triumph" of the new imported gods of the invading Greek speaking peoples from the north (c. 2000 BC) over the old gods of the existing peoples of the Greek peninsula. For the Greeks, the Gigantomachy represented a victory for order over chaos—the victory of the divine order and rationalism of the Olympian gods over the discord and excessive violence of the earth-born chthonic Giants. More specifically, for sixth and fifth century BC Greeks, it represented a victory for civilization over barbarism, and as such was used by Phidias on the metopes of the Parthenon and the shield of Athena Parthenos to symbolize the victory of the Athenians over the Persians. Later the Attalids similarly used the Gigantomachy on the Pergamon Altar to symbolize their victory over the Galatians of Asia Minor.

The attempt of the Giants to overthrow the Olympians also represented the ultimate example of hubris, with the gods themselves punishing the Giants for their arrogant challenge to the gods' divine authority. The Gigantomachy can also be seen as a continuation of the struggle between Gaia (Mother Earth) and Uranus (Father Sky), and thus as part of the primal opposition between female and male. Plato compares the Gigantomachy to a philosophical dispute about existence, wherein the materialist philosophers, who believe that only physical things exist, like the Giants, wish to "drag down everything from heaven and the invisible to earth".

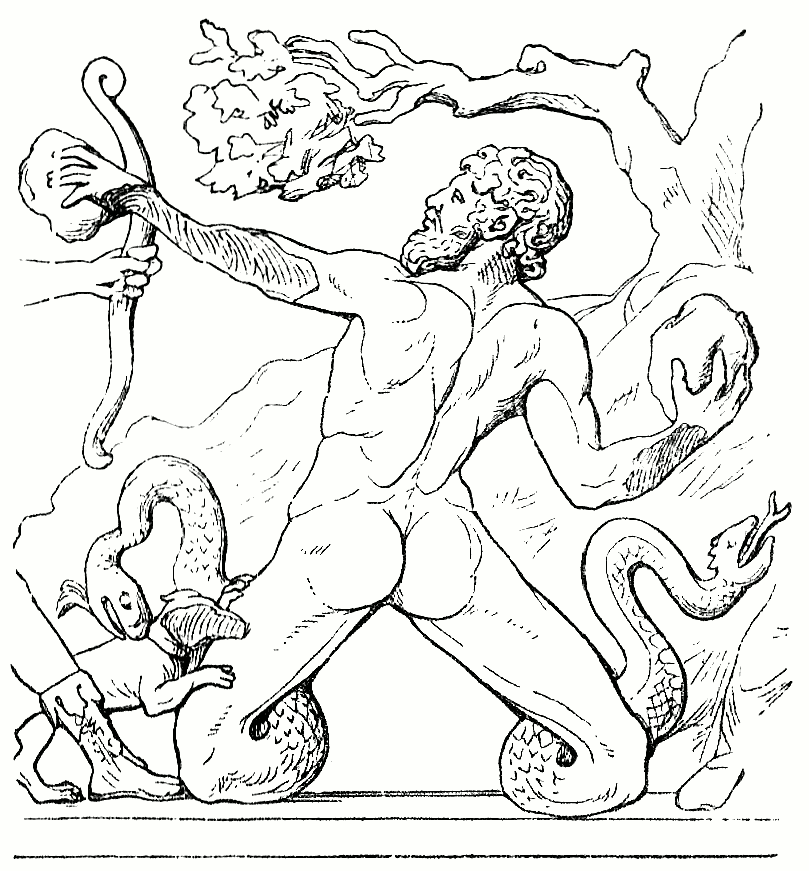
A Giant fighting Artemis. Illustration of a Roman relief in the Vatican Museum.

In Latin literature, in which the Giants, the Titans, Typhon and the Aloadae are all often conflated, Gigantomachy imagery is a frequent occurrence. Cicero, while urging the acceptance of aging and death as natural and inevitable, allegorizes the Gigantomachy as "fighting against Nature". The rationalist Epicurean poet Lucretius, for whom such things as lightning, earthquakes and volcanic eruptions had natural rather than divine causes, used the Gigantomachy to celebrate the victory of philosophy over mythology and superstition. In the triumph of science and reason over traditional religious belief, the Gigantomachy symbolized for him Epicurus storming heaven. In a reversal of their usual meaning, he represents the Giants as heroic rebels against the tyranny of Olympus. Virgil—reversing Lucretius' reversal—restores the conventional meaning, making the Giants once again enemies of order and civilization. Horace makes use of this same meaning to symbolize the victory of Augustus at the Battle of Actium as a victory for the civilized West over the barbaric East.

Ovid, in his Metamorphoses, describes mankind's moral decline through the ages of gold, silver, bronze and iron, and presents the Gigantomachy as a part of that same descent from natural order into chaos. Lucan, in his Pharsalia, which contains many Gigantomachy references, makes the Gorgon's gaze turn the Giants into mountains. Valerius Flaccus, in his Argonautica, makes frequent use of Gigantomachy imagery, with the Argo (the world's first ship) constituting a Gigantomachy-like offense against natural law, and example of hubristic excess.

Claudian, the fourth-century AD court poet of emperor Honorius, composed a Gigantomachia that viewed the battle as a metaphor for vast geomorphic change: "The puissant company of the giants confounds all differences between things; islands abandon the deep; mountains lie hidden in the sea. Many a river is left dry or has altered its ancient course....robbed of her mountains Earth sank into level plains, parted among her own sons."

== Association with volcanoes and earthquakes ==
Various locations associated with the Giants and the Gigantomachy were areas of volcanic and seismic activity (e.g. the Phlegraean Fields west of Naples), and the vanquished Gigantes (along with other "giants") were said to be buried under volcanos. Their subterranean movements were said to be the cause of volcanic eruptions and earthquakes.

The Giant Enceladus was thought to lay buried under Mount Etna, the volcano's eruptions being the breath of Enceladus, and its tremors caused by the Giant rolling over from side to side beneath the mountain (the monster Typhon and the Hundred-Hander Briareus were also said to be buried under Etna). The Giant Alcyoneus along with "many giants" were said to lie under Mount Vesuvius, Prochyte (modern Procida), one of the volcanic Phlegraean Islands was supposed to sit atop the Giant Mimas, and Polybotes was said to lie pinned beneath the volcanic island of Nisyros, supposedly a piece of the island of Kos broken off and thrown by Poseidon.

Describing the catastrophic eruption of Mount Vesuvius in 79 AD, which buried the towns of Pompeii and Herculaneum, Cassius Dio relates accounts of the appearance of many Giant-like creatures on the mountain and in the surrounding area followed by violent earthquakes and the final cataclysmic eruption, saying "some thought that the Giants were rising again in revolt (for at this time also many of their forms could be discerned in the smoke and, moreover, a sound as of trumpets was heard)".

== Named Giants ==
Names for the Giants can be found in ancient literary sources and inscriptions. Vian and Moore provide a list with over seventy entries, some of which are based upon inscriptions which are only partially preserved. Some of the Giants identified by name are:

- Aezeius (Αἰζειός): His son Lycaon was possibly the maternal grandfather of a Lycaon who was king of Arcadia.
- Agrius (Ἄγριος): According to Apollodorus, he was killed by the Moirai (Fates) with bronze clubs.
- Alcyoneus (Ἀλκυονεύς): According to Apollodorus, he was (along with Porphyrion), the greatest of the Giants. Immortal while fighting in his native land, he was dragged from his homeland and killed by Heracles. According to Pindar, he was a herdsman and, in a separate battle from the Gigantomachy, he was killed by Heracles and Telamon, while they were traveling through Phlegra. Representations of Heracles fighting Alcyoneus are found on many sixth century BC and later works of art.
- Alektos/Allektos (Ἀλέκτος/Ἀλλέκτος): Named on the late sixth century Siphnian Treasury (Alektos), and the second century BC Pergamon Altar (Allektos).
- Aristaeus (Ἀρισταῖος): According to the Suda, he was the only Giant to "survive". He is probably named on an Attic black-figure dinos by Lydos (Akropolis 607) dating from the second quarter of the sixth century BC, fighting Hephaestus.
- Astarias (Ἀστερίας) [See Asterius below]
- Aster (Ἀστήρ) [See Asterius below]
- Asterius (Ἀστέριος: "Bright one" or "Glitterer"): A Giant (also called Aster), killed by Athena whose death, according to some accounts, was celebrated by the Panathenaea. Probably the same as the Giant Astarias named on the late sixth century Siphnian Treasury. Probably also the same as Asterus, mentioned in the epic poem Meropis, as an invulnerable warrior killed by Athena. In the poem, Heracles, while fighting the Meropes, a race of Giants, on the Island of Kos, would have been killed but for Athena's intervention. Athena kills and flays Asterus and uses his impenetrable skin for her aegis. Other accounts name others whose hide provided Athena's aegis: Apollodorus has Athena flay the Giant Pallas, while Euripides' Ion has "the Gorgon", an offspring of Gaia born by her as an ally for the Giant, as Athena's victim.
- Asterus (Ἀστέρος) [See Asterius above]
- Clytius (Κλυτίος): According to Apollodorus, he was killed by Hecate with her torches.

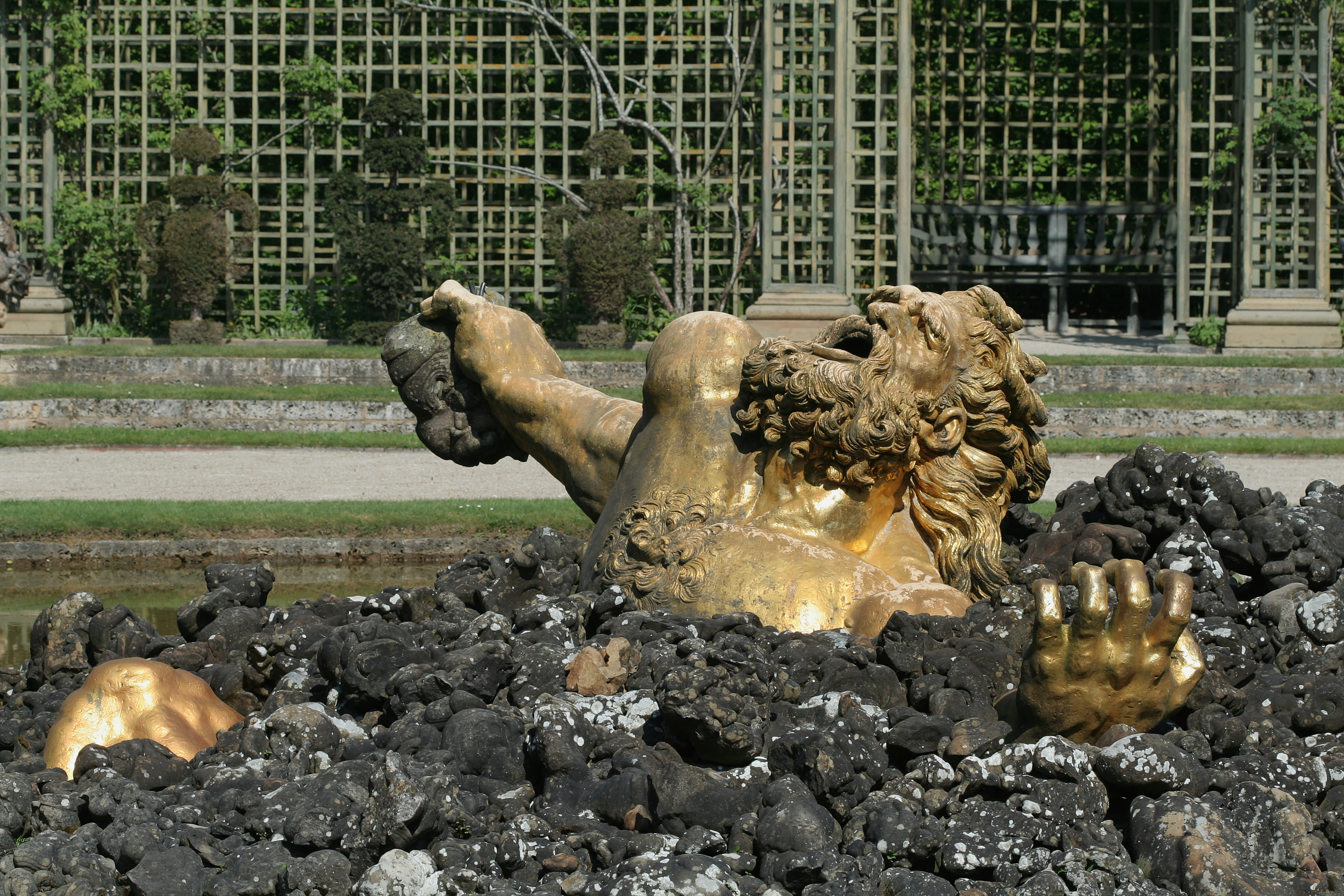
Gilt-bronze Enceladus by Gaspar Mercy in the Bosquet de l'Encélade in the gardens of Versailles

- Damysus (Δάμυσος): The fastest of the Giants. Chiron exhumed his body, removed the ankle and incorporated it into Achilles burnt foot.
- Enceladus (Ἐγκέλαδος): A Giant named Enceladus, fighting Athena, is attested in art as early as an Attic Black-figure pot dating from the second quarter of the sixth century BC (Louvre E732). Euripides has Athena fighting him with her "Gorgon shield" (her aegis). According to Apollodorus, he was crushed by Athena under the Island of Sicily. Virgil has him struck by Zeus' lightning bolt, and both Virgil and Claudian have him buried under Mount Etna (other traditions had Typhon or Briareus buried under Etna). For some Enceladus was instead buried in Italy.
- Ephialtes (Ἐφιάλτης): probably different from the Aload Giant who was also named Ephialtes): According to Apollodorus he was blinded by arrows from Apollo and Heracles. He is named on three Attic black-figure pots (Akropolis 2134, Getty 81.AE.211, Louvre E732) dating from the second quarter of the sixth century BC. On Louvre E732 he is, along with Hyperbios and Agasthenes, opposed by Zeus, while on Getty 81.AE.211 his opponents are apparently Apollo and Artemis. He is also named on the late sixth century BC Siphnian Treasury, where he is probably one of the opponents of Apollo and Artemis, and probably as well on what might be the earliest representation of the Gigantomachy, a pinax fragment from Eleusis (Eleusis 349). He is also named on a late fifth century BC cup from Vulci (Berlin F2531), shown battling Apollo. Although the usual opponent of Poseidon among the Giants is Polybotes, one early fifth century red-figure column krater (Vienna 688) has Poseidon attacking Ephialtes.
- Euryalus (Εὐρύαλος): He is named on a late sixth century red-figure cup (Akropolis 2.211) and an early fifth century red-figure cup (British Museum E 47) fighting Hephaestos.
- Eurymedon (Εὐρυμέδων): According to Homer, he was a king of the Giants and father of Periboea (mother of Nausithous, king of the Phaeacians, by Poseidon), who "brought destruction on his froward people". He was possibly the Eurymedon who raped Hera producing Prometheus as offspring (according to an account attributed to the Hellenistic poet Euphorion). He is probably named on Akropolis 2134. He is possibly mentioned by the Latin poet Propertius as an opponent of Jove.
- Eurytus (Εὔρυτος): According to Apollodorus, he was killed by Dionysus with his thyrsus.
- Gration (Γρατίων): According to Apollodorus, he was killed by Artemis. His name may have been corrupted text, as various emendations have been suggested, including Aigaion (Αἰγαίων - "goatish", "stormy"), Eurytion (Εὐρυτίων: "fine flowing", "widely honored") and Rhaion (Ῥαίων - "more adaptable", "more relaxed").
- Hopladamas or Hopladamus (Ὁπλαδάμας or Ὁπλάδαμος): Possibly named (as Hopladamas) on two vases dating from the second quarter of the sixth century BC, on one (Akropolis 607) being speared by Apollo, while on the other (Getty 81.AE.211) attacking Zeus. Mentioned (as Hopladamus) by the geographer Pausanias as being a leader of Giants enlisted by the Titaness Rhea, pregnant with Zeus, to defend herself from her husband Cronus.
- Hippolytus (Ἱππόλυτος): According to Apollodorus, he was killed by Hermes, who was wearing Hades' helmet which made its wearer invisible.
- Lion or Leon (Λέων): Possibly a Giant, he is mentioned by Photius (as ascribed to Ptolemy Hephaestion) as a giant who was challenged to single combat by Heracles and killed. Lion-headed Giants are shown on the Gigantomachy frieze of the second century BC Pergamon Altar.
- Mimas (Μίμας): According to Apollodorus, he was killed by Hephaestus. Euripides has Zeus burning him "to ashes" with his thunderbolt. According to others he was killed by Ares. "Mimos"—possibly in error for "Mimas"—is inscribed (retrograde) on Akropolis 607. He was said to be buried under Prochyte. Mimas is possibly the same as the Giant named Mimon on the late sixth century BC Siphnian Treasury, as well as on a late fifth century BC cup from Vulci (Berlin F2531) shown fighting Ares. Several depictions in Greek art, though, show Aphrodite as the opponent of Mimas.
- Mimon (Μίμων) [See Mimas above]
- Mimos (Μίμος) [See Mimas above]

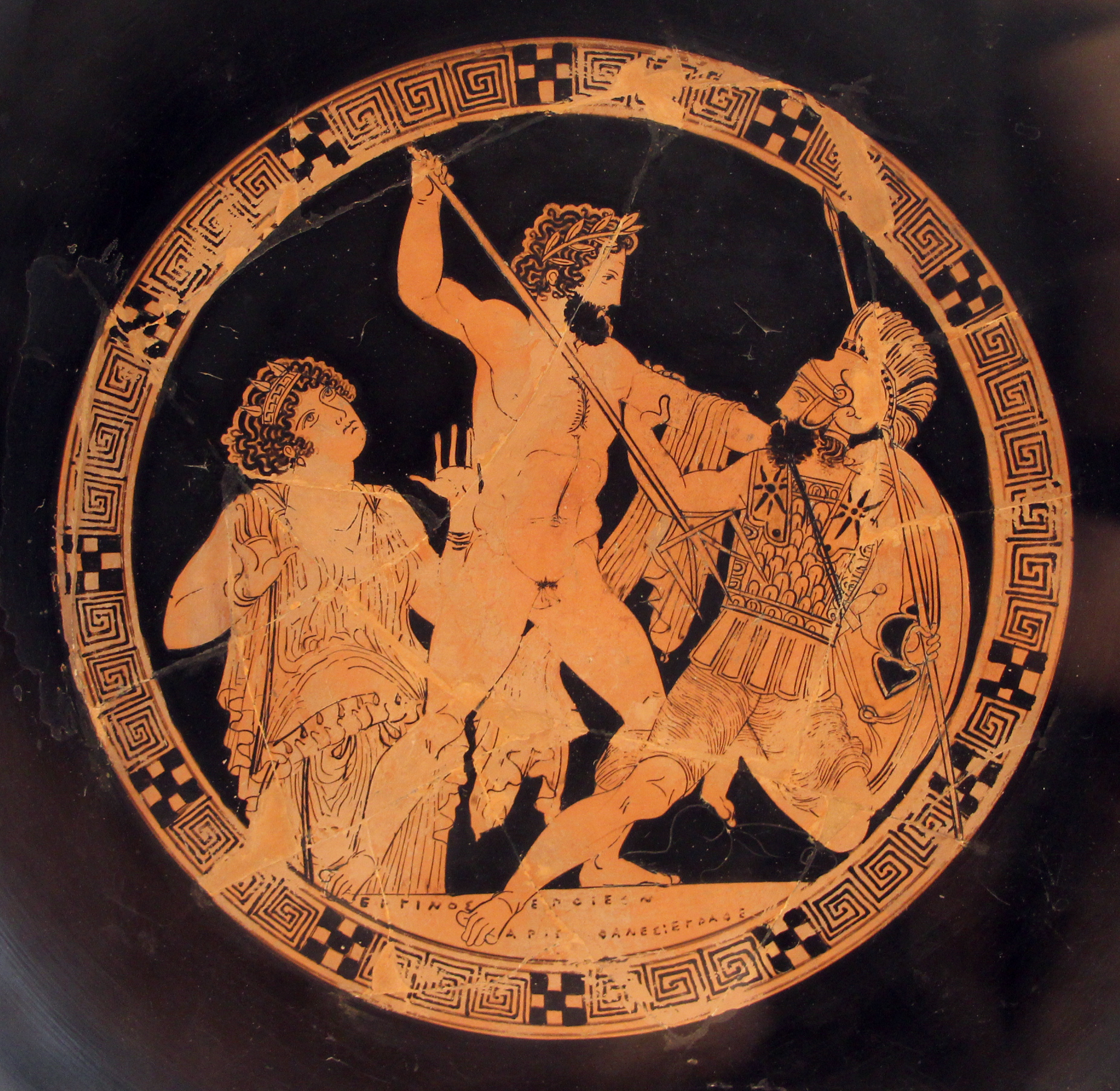
Poseidon attacks Polybotes in the presence of Gaia, red-figure cup late fifth century BC (Antikensammlung Berlin F2531)

- Pallas (Πάλλας): According to Apollodorus, he was flayed by Athena, who used his skin as a shield. Other accounts name others whose hyde provided Athena's aegis [see Asterus above]. Claudian names Pallas as one of several Giants turned to stone by Minerva's Gorgon shield.
- Pelorus (Πέλορος): According to Claudian, he was killed by Mars, the Roman equivalent of Ares.
- Picolous (Πικόλοος): A Giant who fled the battle and came to Circe's island and attempted to chase her away, only to be killed by Helios. It is said that the legendary moly plant first sprang forth from Picolous' blood as it seeped into the ground.
- Polybotes (Πολυβότης): According to Apollodorus, he was crushed under Nisyros, a piece of the island of Kos broken off and thrown by Poseidon. He is named on two sixth century BC pots, on one (Getty 81.AE.211) he is opposed by Zeus, on the other (Louvre E732) he is opposed by Poseidon carrying Nisyros on his shoulder.
- Porphyrion (Πορφυρίων): According to Apollodorus, he was (along with Alcyoneus), the greatest of the Giants. He attacked Heracles and Hera but Zeus "smote him with a thunderbolt, and Hercules shot him dead with an arrow." According to Pindar, who calls him "king of the Giants", he was slain by an arrow from the bow of Apollo. He is named on a late fifth century BC cup from Vulci (Berlin F2531), where he is battling with Zeus. He was also probably named on the late sixth century BC Siphnian Treasury.
- Thoas or Thoon (Θόας or Θόων): According to Apollodorus, he was killed by the Moirai (Fates) with bronze clubs.

== See also ==
- Amazonomachy
- Centauromachy
- Giant
- Gibborim
- Nephilim
