= Temple of Juno =

Temple of Juno is commonly used to refer to the following Roman and Greek temples dedicated to the goddess Juno

- Temple of Juno Moneta on the Capitoline Hill in Rome
- Temple of Juno at Acragas, Sicily
- Tas-Silġ, an archaeological site in Marsaxlokk, Malta containing the remains of a temple of Juno

== See also ==
- Temple of Hera
