= Damysus (Giant) =

Giant from Greek mythology, son of Uranus and Gea

Damysus or Damysos (Greek: Δάμυσος), was the fastest of all the Giants in the Greek mythology.

In the sixth book of the New History, ascribed by Photius to Ptolemy Hephaestion, mention that Thetis, the mother of Achilles, burned in a secret place the children she had by Peleus, but when she had Achilles, Peleus noticed and tore him from the flames with only a burnt foot, then confided him to the centaur Chiron.

Later, Chiron exhumed the body of the Damysus who was buried at Pallene, removed the ankle and incorporated it into Achilles' burnt foot. The ankle fell when Achilles was pursued by Apollo during the Trojan War and it was thus that Achilles was killed.
