= Alcyoneus =

Giant in Greek mythology

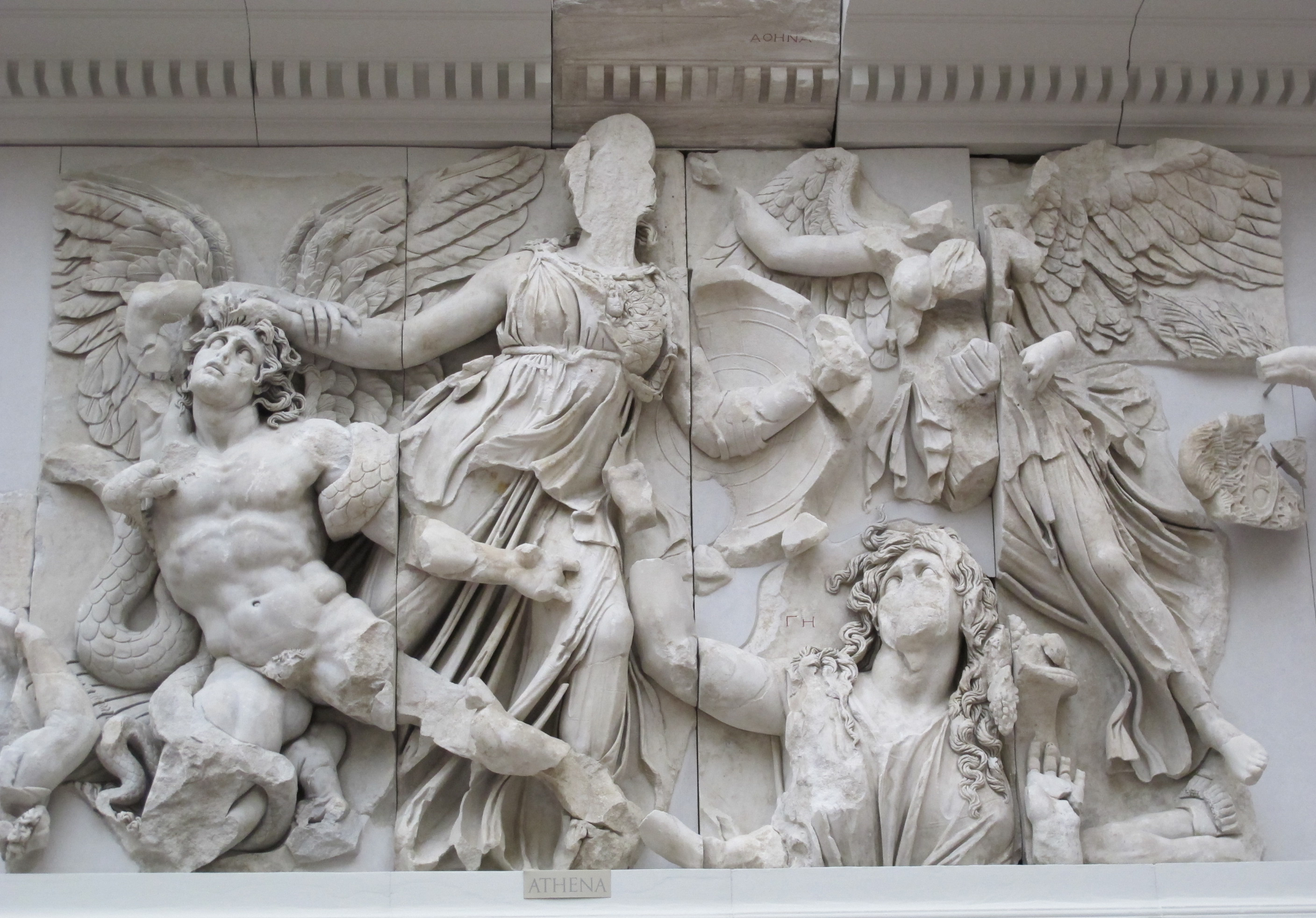
Alcyoneus (?), Athena, Gaia, and Nike, detail of the Gigantomachy frieze, Pergamon Altar, Pergamon museum, Berlin.

In Greek mythology, Alcyoneus or Alkyoneus (/ælˈsaɪ.əˌnjuːs/; Ancient Greek: Ἀλκυονεύς, romanized: Alkyoneús) was a traditional opponent of the hero Heracles. He was usually considered to be one of the Gigantes (Giants), the offspring of Gaia born from the blood of the castrated Uranus.

According to the mythographer Apollodorus, Alcyoneus's confrontation with Heracles was part of the Gigantomachy, the cosmic battle of the Giants with the Olympian gods. In Apollodorus's account Alcyoneus and Porphyrion were the greatest of the Giants, and Alcyoneus was immortal as long as he was in his native land. When Heracles shot Alcyoneus with an arrow, Alcyoneus fell to the ground but then began to revive, so on the advice of Athena, Heracles dragged Alcyoneus out of his homeland where Alcyoneus then died.

In one of his Isthmian Odes, Pindar mentions Heracles's defeat of Alyconeus, describing the giant as a herdsman as tall as a mountain, but makes no mention of the Gigantomachy. However, in some accounts Alcyoneus caused the Gigantomachy by stealing the cattle of Helios. Vase paintings suggest a version of the story in which Heracles encounters a sleeping Alcyoneus.

His seven daughters are the Alkyonides.

== Early sources ==
Early sources provide glimpses of other versions of the story from the one that Apollodorus tells. Possibly Alcyoneus was not originally a Giant, but simply one of Heracles's many monstrous opponents.

=== Iconography ===
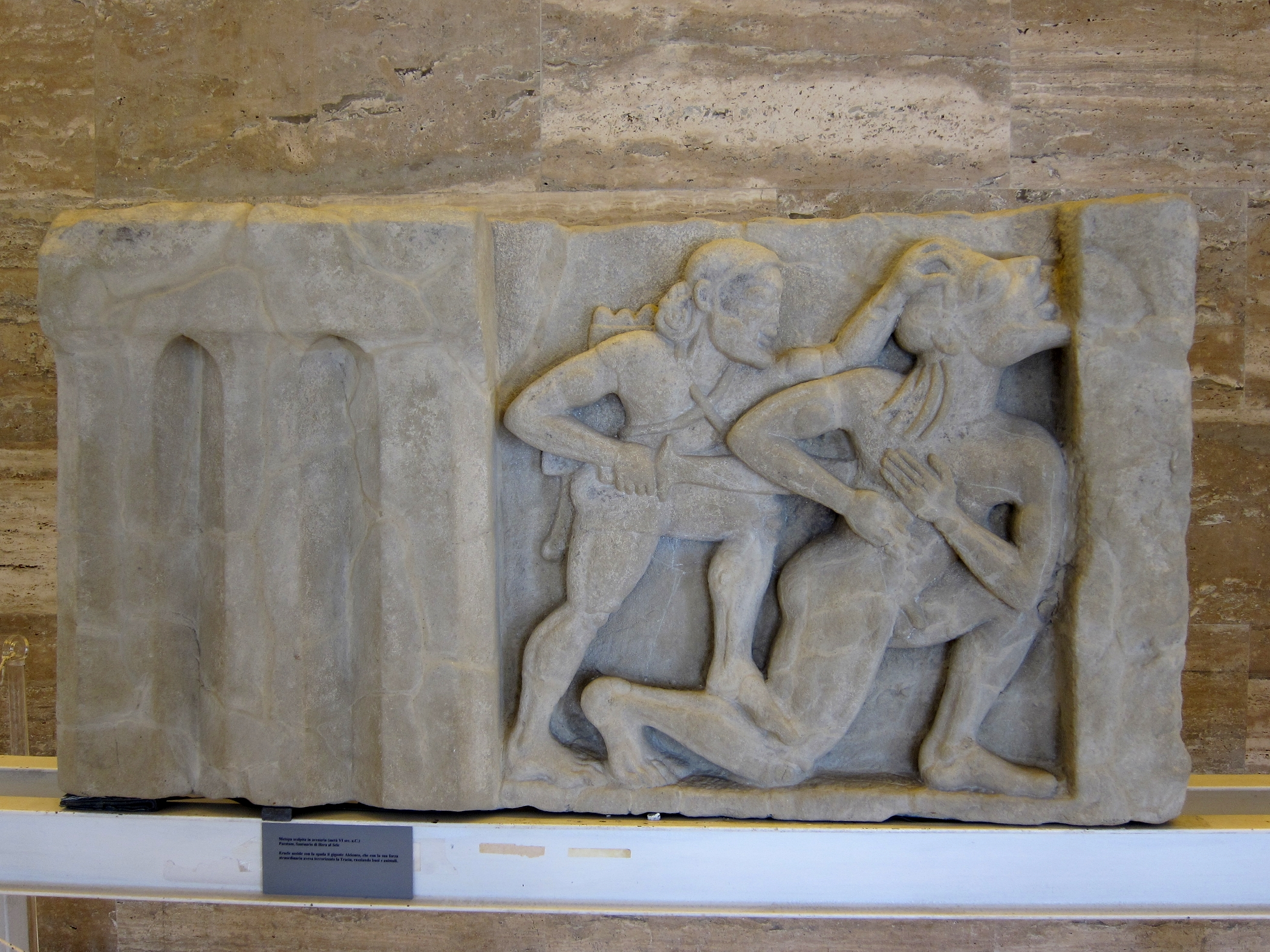
Heracles and Alcyoneus, metope from the first Heraion at Foce del Sele

Depictions of Heracles fighting Alcyoneus, named by inscription, are found on several sixth century BC pots (e.g., Louvre F208). The earliest extant representation of their battle probably occurs on a metope from the first temple dedicated to Hera at Foce del Sele, which shows Heracles holding a large figure by the hair, while stabbing him with a sword. Such a scene is also depicted on several shield-band reliefs from Olympia (B 1801, B 1010).

A terracotta frieze (Basel BS 318) and the sixth century BC pots show a reclining Alcyoneus. And on some of the pots Alcyoneus is apparently sleeping, with a winged Hypnos nearby (Melborne 1730.4, Getty 84.AE.974, Munich 1784, Toledo 52.66). These depictions suggest the existence of a story in which Heracles takes advantage of a sleeping opponent.

The presence of cattle on several of the pots suggests that the story also involved cattle in some way (e.g., Tarquinia RC 2070, Taranto 7030). This last pot depicts Heracles, with a headlock perhaps dragging his opponent, which might be a representation of Heracles dragging Alcyoneus out of his homeland.

=== Literature ===
The earliest mentions of Alcyoneus in literature, are by the fifth century BC poet Pindar. According to Pindar, Heracles and Telamon were traveling through Phlegra, where they encountered Alcyoneus, whom Pindar describes as a "herdsman ... huge as a mountain", and a "great and terrible warrior". A battle occurs in which Alcyoneus "laid low, by hurling a rock, twelve chariots and twice twelve horse-taming heroes who were riding in them", before finally being "destroyed" by the two heroes.

The participation of Telamon and other mortals in the battle, and the lack of mention of any of the gods, or other Giants, seem to imply that for Pindar, unlike apparently Apollodorus, the battle between Heracles and Alcyoneus was a separate event from the Gigantomachy. And in fact Pindar never actually calls Alcyoneus a Giant, although the description of him as "huge as a mountain", his use of a rock as a weapon, and the location of the battle at Phlegra, the usual site of the Gigantomachy, all suggest that he was.

Scholia to Pindar tell us that Alcyoneus lived on the isthmus of Thrace and that he had stolen his cattle from Helios, causing the Gigantomachy, (Schol. Pindar Isthmian 6.47) and that Alcyoneus, one of the Giants, attacked Heracles, not in Thrace but at the Isthmus of Corinth, while the hero was returning with the cattle of Geryon, and that this was according to Zeus's plan because the Giants were his enemies (Schol. Pindar Nemean 4.43). The cattle shown on the sixth century pots, might thus represent either Alcyoneus's cattle stolen from Helios, or Heracles's cattle taken from Geryon. Apollodorus mentions the theft of Helios's cattle as an event of the Gigantomachy, but not the cause of it.

== Other sources ==
Alcyoneus is usually identified as the winged Giant battling Athena on the Gigantomachy frieze from the Pergamon Altar.

An unascribed lyric fragment (985 PMG) calls the Giant "Phlegraian Alkyoneus of Pallene, the eldest of the Gigantes [Giants]". Claudian has Alcyoneus buried under the volcanic Mount Vesuvius while Philostratus says that the bones of Alcyoneus were considered a "marvel" by the people living near Vesuvius, where it was said that many Giants were buried. The Suda says that Hegesander told of a myth in which Alcyoneus had seven daughters, the Alkyonides, who threw themselves into the sea when Alcyoneus died and were turned into birds, the Halcyons (kingfishers).

The late fourth century or early fifth century AD Greek poet Nonnus, in his poem Dionysiaca, mentions Alcyoneus as one of the several Giants that Dionysus battles in the Gigantomachy. Nonnus has Gaia set the Giants against Dionysus, promising Alcyoneus Artemis as his wife should the Giants subdue Dionysus. Nonnus makes Alcyoneus nine cubits high, and has him fight with mountains as weapons.

== See also ==
- Mimas
- Enceladus
- Picolous
