= Phlegraean Islands =

Archipelago in the Gulf of Naples

Coordinates: 40°45′N 14°1′E

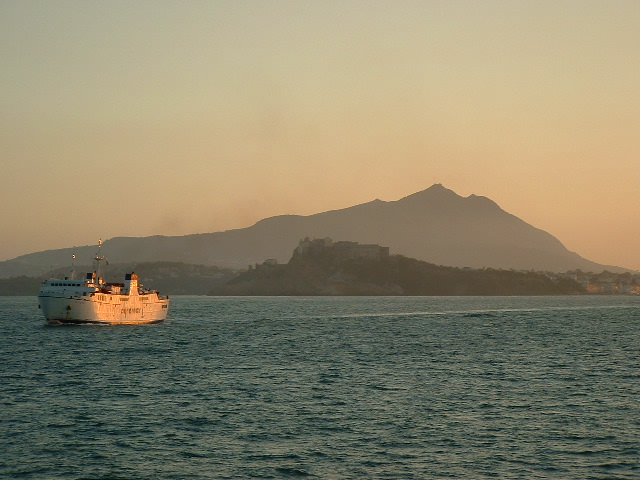
Procida, with Ischia in the background, seen from Cape Miseno.

The Phlegraean Islands (Italian: Isole Flegree [ˈiːzole fleˈɡrɛːe]; Neapolitan: Isule Flegree) are an archipelago in the Gulf of Naples and the Campania region of southern Italy.

The name is derived from the common affiliation to the geologic area of the Phlegraean Fields.

== Geography ==
It consists of the islands of Ischia, Procida, Vivara, and Nisida. They are part of the Campanian volcanic arc and Campanian Archipelago (Neapolitan Archipelago), off the coast of Naples in the Tyrrhenian Sea.

The archipelago is within the Metropolitan City of Naples.

The island of Capri is usually excluded, as it does not belong to the same geologic formations.

== History ==
In the classical epoch, some Phlegraean Islands were called Pithecussae, the Greek Pithekousai (Πιθηκοῦσαι, ‘islands of monkeys’). A Greek myth tells of two brigands, the Cercopes of Ephesus, who played pranks on Zeus, who then punished them by turning them into monkeys and exiling them to the islands of Aenaria (Ischia) and Prochyta (Procida).

Legend had the monster Typhon buried under Ischia, and the Giant Mimas buried under Procida. Such stories might be significant as a clue to how the ancient Greeks attempted to account for the volcanism of the whole area. The resulting changes in the topography of the islands were due to the frequent intervention of deities.

== See also ==
- List of islands of Italy
- Campanian volcanic arc
- Volcanoes of the Tyrrhenian Sea
