= Gration (giant) =

Giant in Greek mythology

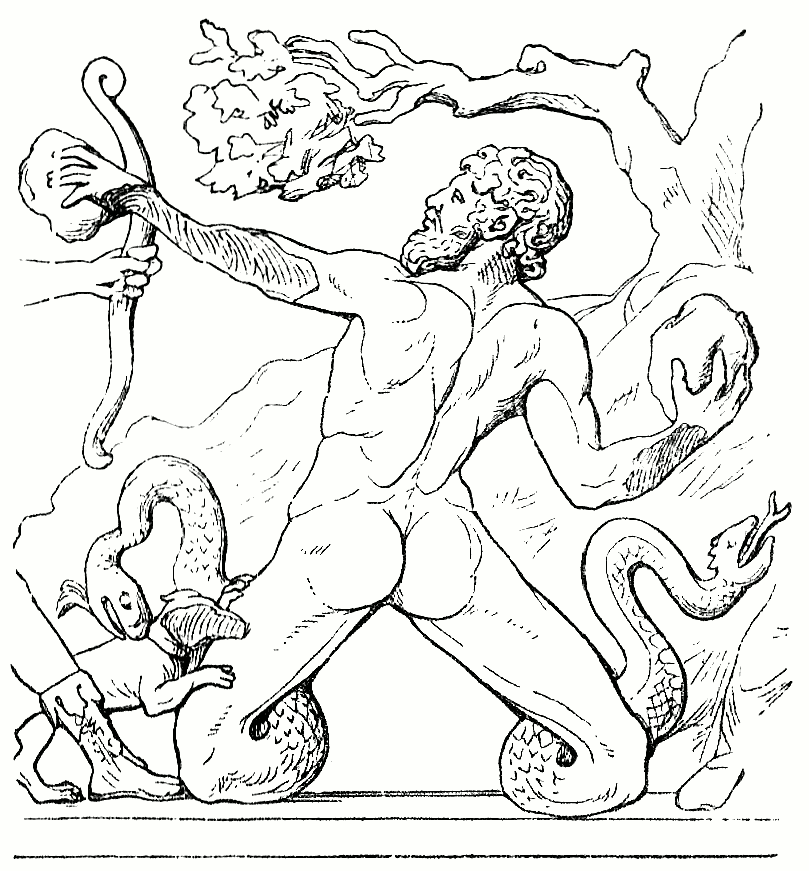
Gration the giant

Gration (Γρατίων) is a giant from Greek mythology. His name might have been corrupted. He was killed by Artemis and shot with arrows by Heracles in his death throe.

== Mythology ==
Gration was born from Gaia and Uranus.

He was killed by the goddess Artemis with the help of Heracles. Alternatively, he was killed solely by Heracles. One story tells that Gration owned a two headed dog.

== Name ==
His name may have been corrupted. Various emendations have been suggested, including Aigaion (Αἰγαίων - "goatish", "stormy"), Eurytion (Εὐρυτίων - "fine flowing", "widely honored") and Rhaion (Ῥαίων - "more adaptable", "more relaxed").
