= Heraion =

A Heraion /həˈreɪˌɒn/ or Heraeum /həˈriːəm/ is a temple dedicated to the Greek goddess Hera

Notable temples include:

- Heraion of Samos, the most important of the sanctuaries dedicated to Hera
- Heraion of Argos, near Nafplion in Argolis
- Heraion of Perachora (Hera Akraia and Hera Limenia), near Corinth
- Temple of Hera (Olympia)
- Heraion of Metapontum, usually known as the Tavole Palatine, in Magna Graecia
- Heraion at the mouth of the Sele, Paestum, Magna Graecia
- Second Temple of Hera (Paestum), Paestum, Magna Graecia
- Heraion of Selinunte

Heraion may also refer to:

- Heraion (Bithynia), an ancient Greek town in Bithynia, also known as Heraia
- Heraion (Thrace), an ancient Greek city in Thrace, also known as Heraion Teichos
- the sea-side village near the temple dedicated to Hera in Samos

== See also ==
- Category:Temples of Hera
- Temple of Juno (disambiguation)
