= Porphyrion =

Giant in Greek mythology

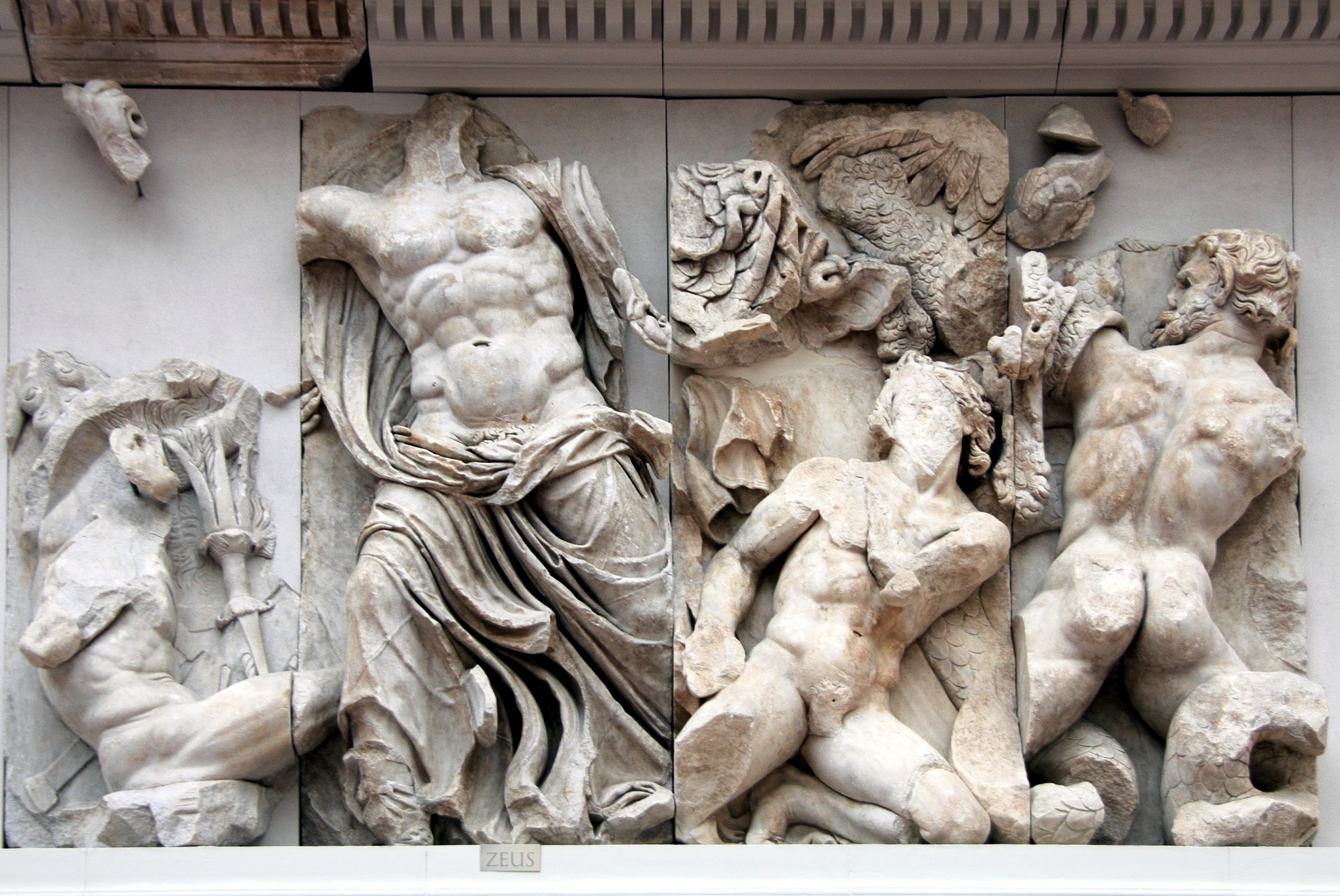
Zeus (center left) against Porphyrion (far right), detail from the Pergamon Altar Gigantomachy frieze, Pergamon Museum Berlin

In Greek mythology, Porphyrion (Ancient Greek: Πορφυρίων, romanized: Porphyríōn or Porphyriôn, lit. 'surging', 'gleaming darkly' or 'purple') was one of the Gigantes (Giants), who according to Hesiod, were the offspring of Gaia, born from the blood that fell when Uranus (Sky) was castrated by their son Cronus. In some other versions of the myth, the Gigantes were born of Gaia and Tartarus.

== Mythology ==
According to the mythographer Apollodorus, Porphyrion was (along with Alcyoneus), the greatest of the Giants, and during the Gigantomachy, the battle between the Giants and the Olympian gods, Porphyrion attacked Heracles and Hera, but Zeus caused Porphyrion to become enamoured of Hera, whom Porphyrion then tried to rape, but Zeus struck Porphyrion with his thunderbolt and Heracles killed him with an arrow. According to Pindar, who calls him "king of the Giants", he was slain by an arrow from the bow of Apollo. Aristophanes' comedy The Birds, contains two brief mentions of Porphyrion. Porphyrion is also mentioned, in the company of other Giants, by the Latin poet Horace.

The late fourth-century AD Latin poet Claudian in his Gigantomachia has Gaia, imagining the Giants victorious, propose that "Porphyrion, wreathe thou thy head with Delphi's laurel and take Cirrha for thy sanctuary", and has Porphyrion attempt "to uproot trembling Delos, wishing to hurl it at the sky". The late fourth or early fifth-century AD Greek poet Nonnus, in his Dionysiaca, has Gaia set the Giants against Dionysus, promising Porphyrion Hebe as his wife should the Giants succeed in subduing the god.

== In art ==
Porphyrion is named on a sixth-century BC black-figure pyxis (Getty 82.AE.26), where he and the Giant Enceladus oppose Zeus, Heracles and Athena. He is also named on a late fifth-century BC red-figure cup from Vulci (Berlin F2531), and a fifth-century BC red-figure krater (Paris, Petit Palais 868), in both engaged in single combat with Zeus, and a late sixth-century/early fifth-century fragmentary BC red-figure cup (British Museum E 47), where his opponent is lost.

Porphyrion was probably named on the Gigantomachy depicted on the north frieze of the Siphnian Treasury at Delphi (c. 525 BC), and he was one of the many Giants depicted on the second-century BC Pergamon Altar Gigantomachy frieze, where he is shown fighting Zeus.
