= Hegesander (historian) =

Hegesander (Ancient Greek: Ἡγήσανδρος) was an ancient Greek historian, and a citizen of Delphi. Besides an historical work, called Commentaries (Greek: Hypomnemata), which consisted of at least six books, and seems to have been of a somewhat discursive character, he wrote a work on statues (hypomnema andrianton kai agalmaton). The period at which he flourished is not known, but he cannot have been more ancient than the reign of Antigonus II Gonatas, which is mentioned by him (Athenaeus. ix. p. 400, d.), and which extended from 283 to 239 BC.
