= Temple F (Selinus) =

Doric order temple at Selinunte likely dating to the sixth century BC

Coordinates: 37.5873°N 12.8349°E

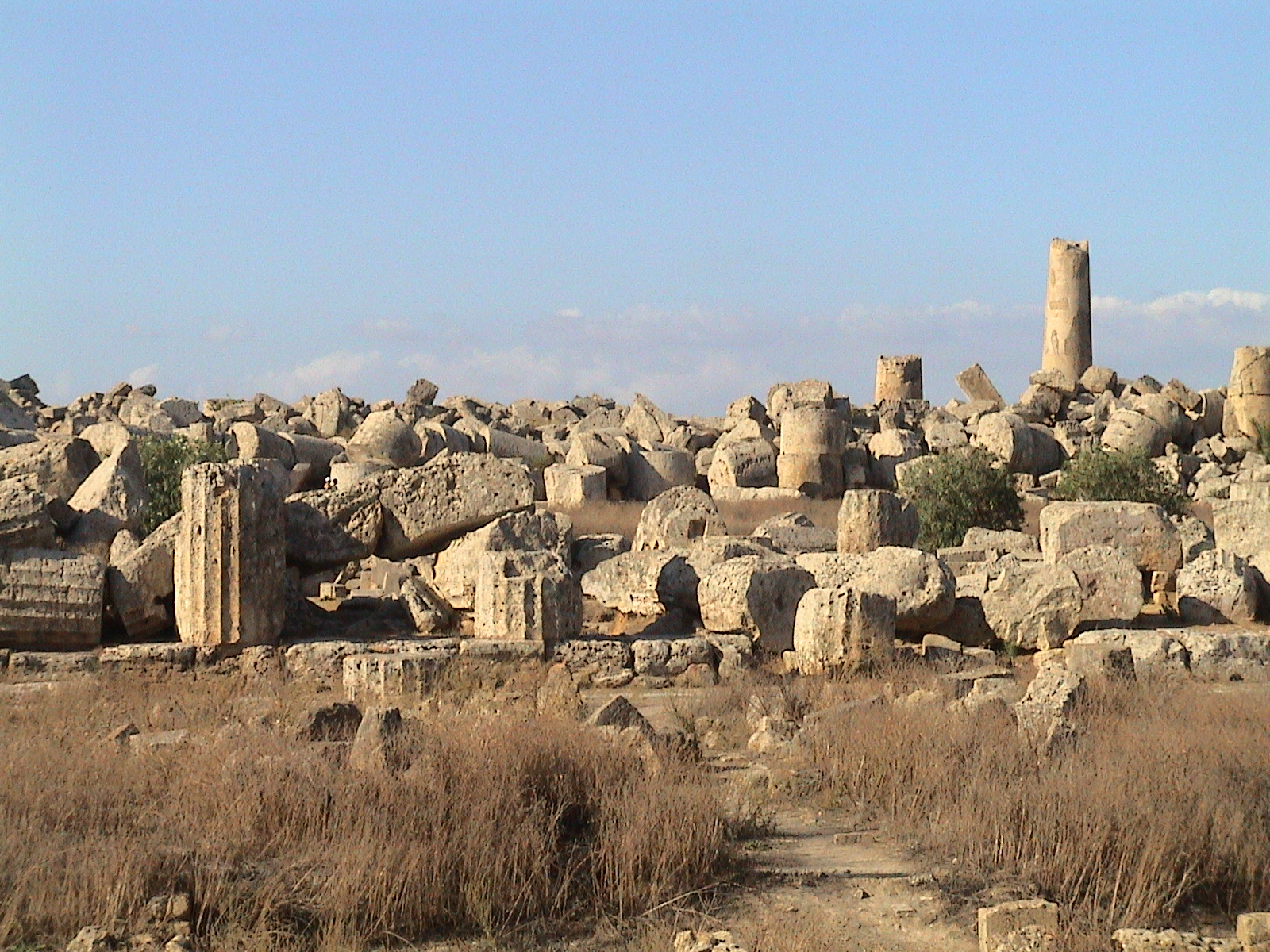
Ruins of Temple F

Temple F at Selinus in Sicily is a Greek temple of Magna Graecia of the Doric order. It was probably dedicated to Dionysus or Athena and is one of the three temples on the East Hill. The temple's dating is very uncertain, but it probably belongs to the middle of the sixth century BC.

== Description ==
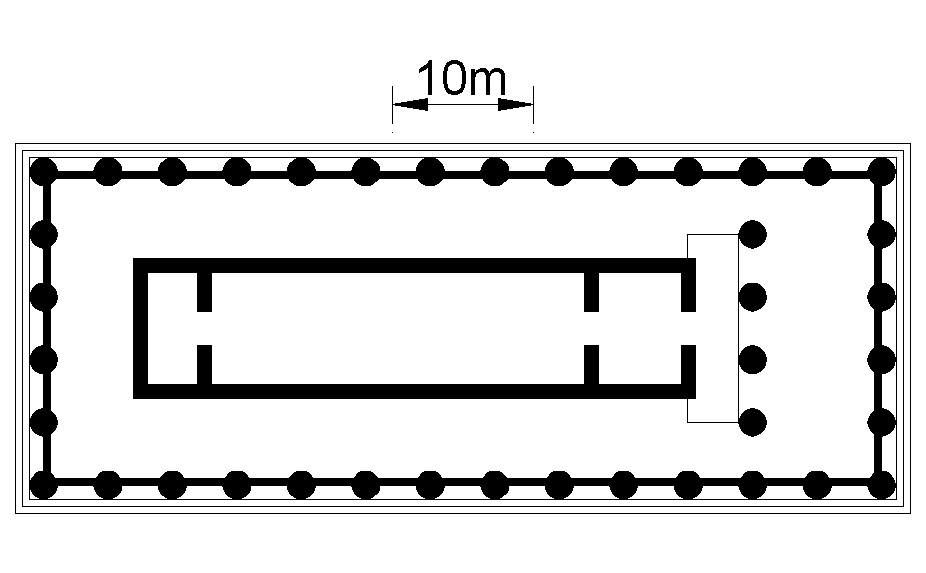
Floor plan

The temple has six columns at the front and fourteen on the flanks and represented a development of the very elongated archaic temple to a more balanced form which was becoming the norm on the Greek mainland as well, and foreshadowing the 2:1 intercolumniation ratio between the long and short sides. The colonnade contained a wider pteron than usual in temples built in Sicily and, as a result, a rather narrow naos with an adyton at the rear and a pronaos with four columns. Except for those in the facade, the columns lack entasis.

The intercolumniation of the peristasis was closed with high masonry barriers. The barriers are about half the height of the columns and were perhaps built in a second phase of construction, perhaps in order to transform the peristasis into a cultic area.

In 1823, during excavations, two half metopes carved in tufa were discovered, depicting Dionysus and Athena respectively. They are now kept in the Antonino Salinas Regional Archeological Museum in Palermo.
