= Picolous =

Giant in Greek mythology

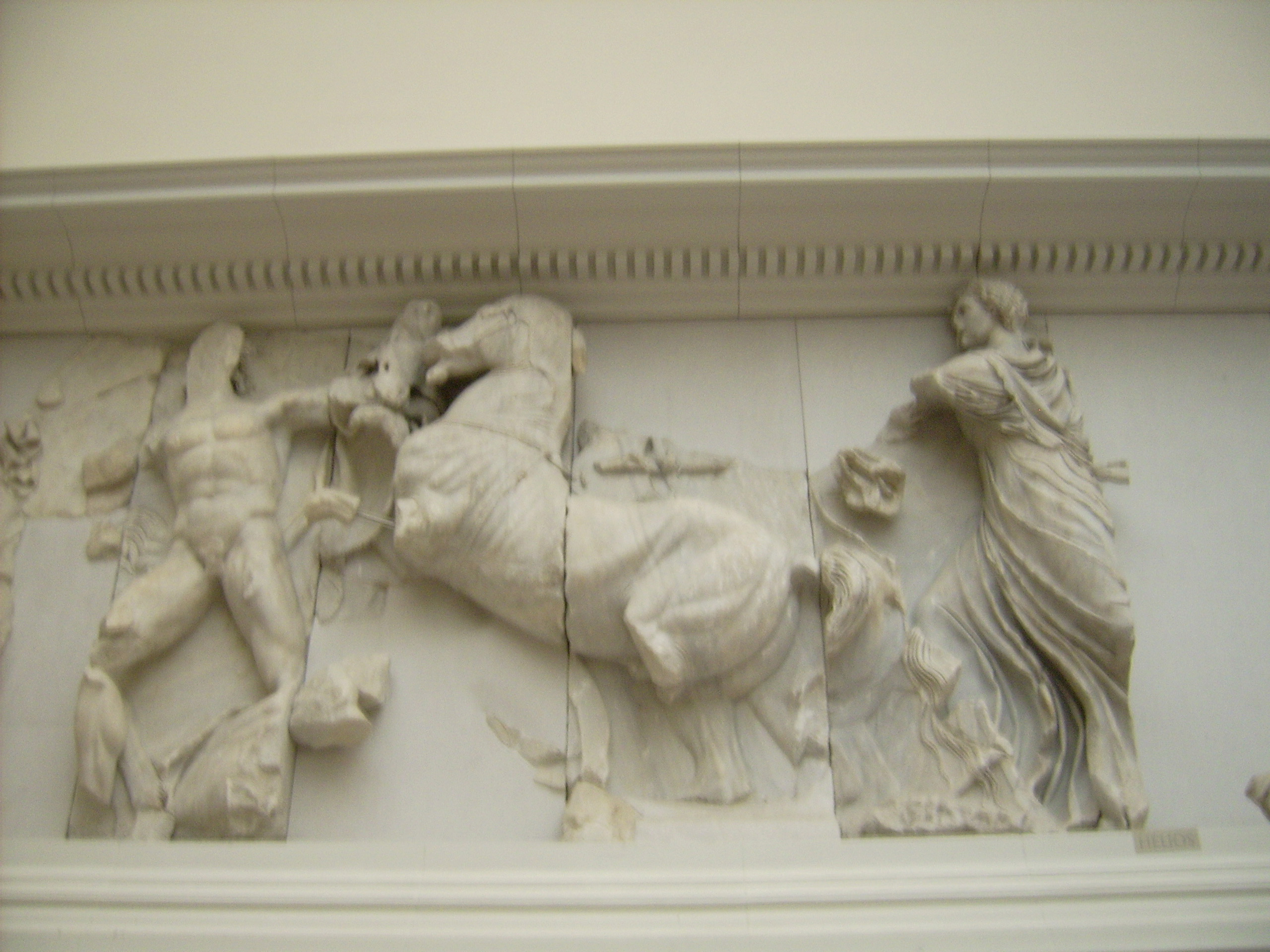
Helios against an unidentified Giant in the southern frieze of the Pergamon Altar, Pergamon Museum, Germany.

In Greek mythology, Picolous (Ancient Greek: Πικόλοος, Pikóloos) is the name of one of the Gigantes, the offspring of the earth-goddess Gaia and the sky-god Uranus. Picolous fought against the Olympian gods during the Gigantomachy. When the Giants lost, he fled the battle, only to be slain shortly thereafter by the sun-god Helios when the giant attempted to attack his daughter Circe on Aeaea, her island.

Picolous's role in the Gigantomachy is attested by two Byzantine scholars of the Middle Ages, Eustathius of Thessalonica and Patriarch Photios I of Constantinople, both of which quote earlier writers, Alexander of Paphos and Ptolemaeus Chennus respectively.

== Etymology ==
The 'unique' etymology of Picolous's name is unclear and hard to decipher, having no apparent cognates in ancient Greek language. Derivation from the Hesiodic phrase Φῖκ' ὀλοήν (meaning terribile Sphinx, in accusative case) has been proposed but rejected on the grounds of being "entirely fanciful.

== Mythology ==
Picoloos, one of the Giants, by fleeing from the war led against Zeus, reached Circe's island and tried to chase her away. Her father Helios killed him, protecting his daughter with his shield. From the blood which flowed on the earth a plant was born, and it was called μῶλυ because of the μῶλος or the battle in which the Giant aforementioned was killed.

— Eustathius, Ad Odysseam 10.305

Patriarch Photius, who attributes the tale to Ptolemy Chennus, writes of an unnamed giant that attacked Circe and was killed by her ally and father the sun-god Helios, who was protecting his daughter. From the giant's dark blood sprang a new white herb, named moly after the hard battle (called môlos in Ancient Greek as he explains) that took place between the giant and the god.

In greater detail, the Byzantine homeric scholar Eustathius of Thessalonica, quoting Alexander of Paphos, writes that Picolous fought alongside the other Giants against Zeus at the behest of Gaia (the Earth) during the war that was known as the Gigantomachy, but he fled the battle as the tide turned against them and the gods felled one Giant after another.

He then went to Aeaea, the home island of the sorceress-goddess Circe and attempted to chase her away from her land. Seeing that, her father Helios slew him. From the blood of the giant that seeped on the ground a herb, moly, sprang that had a black root for the black blood of Picolous, and a white flower for the white Sun that killed him, or for the fact that Circe grew white out of terror.

== Picolous's plant ==
Moly, the plant that sprang from Picolous's death, has been linked to the Prometheion, the special plant that Circe's niece Medea used for her potion, which has a similar origin story as both were said to have grown from blood, that of Picolous and Prometheus respectively, as well as the Κιρκαῖον, "Circe's plant", another magical herb connected to Circe.

As for real-world plant identifications, the flower that grew from Picolous's blood has been suggested to be the snowdrop, a white flower that counteracts amnesia, hallucinations, and delusions, which are hypothesized to be the real physics behind Circe's magic.

== See also ==
Other Greek mythological giants:

- Alcyoneus
- Clytius
- Mimas (giant)
- Polybotes
