= Polybotes =

Giant in Greek mythology

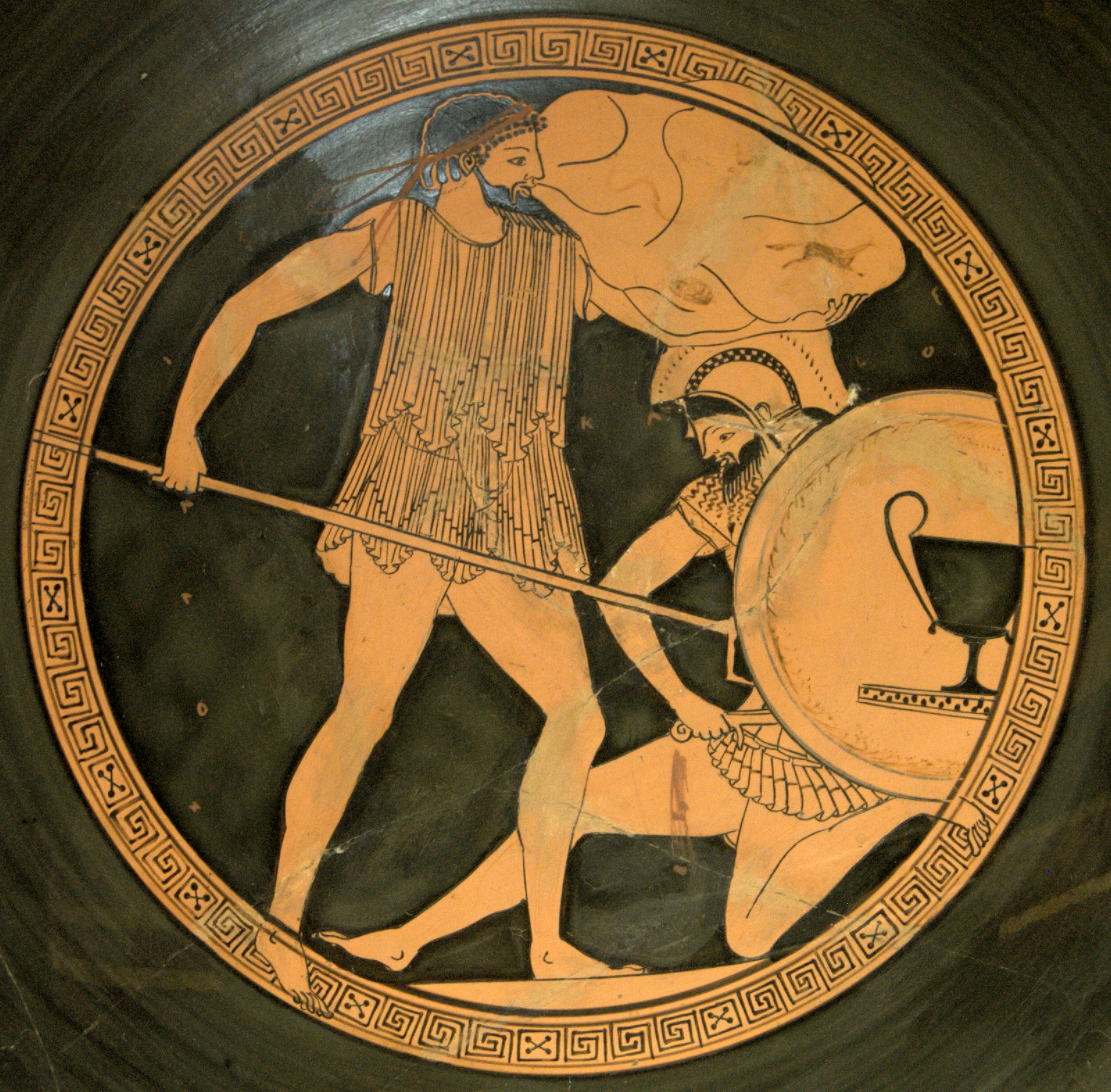
Poseidon (left) holding a trident, with the island Nisyros on his shoulder, battling a Giant (probably Polybotes), red-figure cup c. 500–450 BC (Cabinet des Medailles 573).

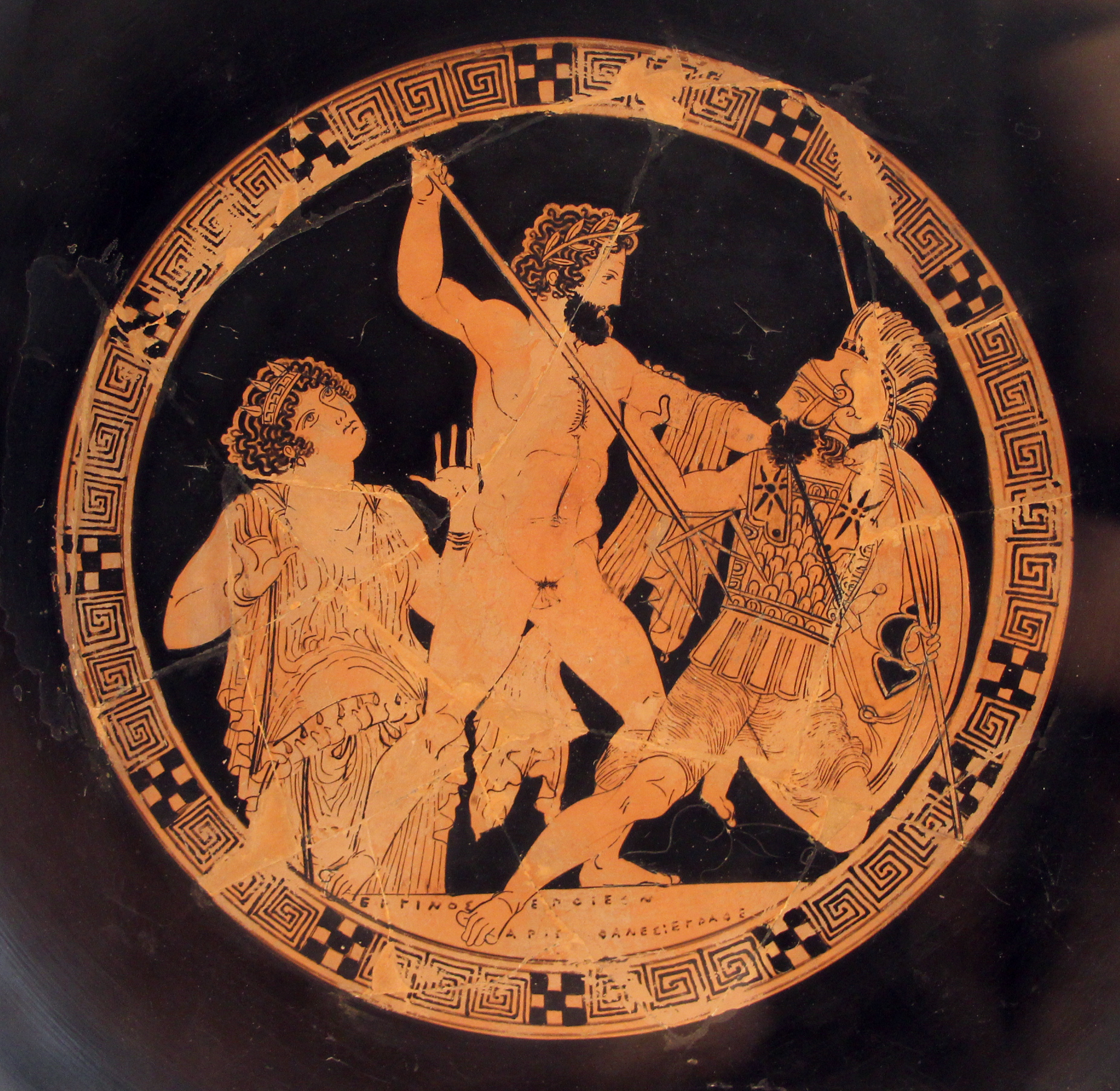
Poseidon attacks Polybotes in the presence of Gaia, red-figure cup late fifth-century BC (Antikensammlung Berlin F2531)

In Greek mythology, Polybotes (/ˌpɒlɪˈboʊtiːz/) (Ancient Greek: Πολυβώτης) was one of the giants, the offspring of Gaia (Earth) and Uranus (Sky). He fought Poseidon during the Gigantomachy, the war between the giants and the gods.

== Mythology ==
Polybotes was one of the Gigantes (Giants), the offspring of Gaia, born from the blood that fell when Uranus was castrated by their son Cronus. According to the mythographer Apollodorus, during the Gigantomachy, the cosmic battle of the Giants with the Olympian gods, Polybotes was crushed under Nisyros, a piece of the island of Kos broken off and thrown by Poseidon:

Polybotes was chased through the sea by Poseidon and came to Cos; and Poseidon, breaking off that piece of the island which is called Nisyrum, threw it on him.

The first-century BC geographer Strabo also records the story of Polybotes buried under Nisyros (or Kos itself):

They say that Nisyros is a fragment of Cos, and they add the myth that Poseidon, when he was pursuing one of the giants, Polybotes, broke off a fragment of Cos with his trident and hurled it upon him, and the missile became an island, Nisyros, with the giant lying beneath it. But some say that he lies beneath Cos.

The mention of a millstone, in a poem fragment by the seventh-century BC poet Alcman may be an early reference to the island of Nisyros.

The second-century AD geographer Pausanias mentions seeing at Athens a statue of Poseidon battling Polybotes:

Not far from the temple is Poseidon on horseback, hurling a spear against the giant Polybotes, concerning whom is prevalent among the Coans the story about the promontory of Chelone.

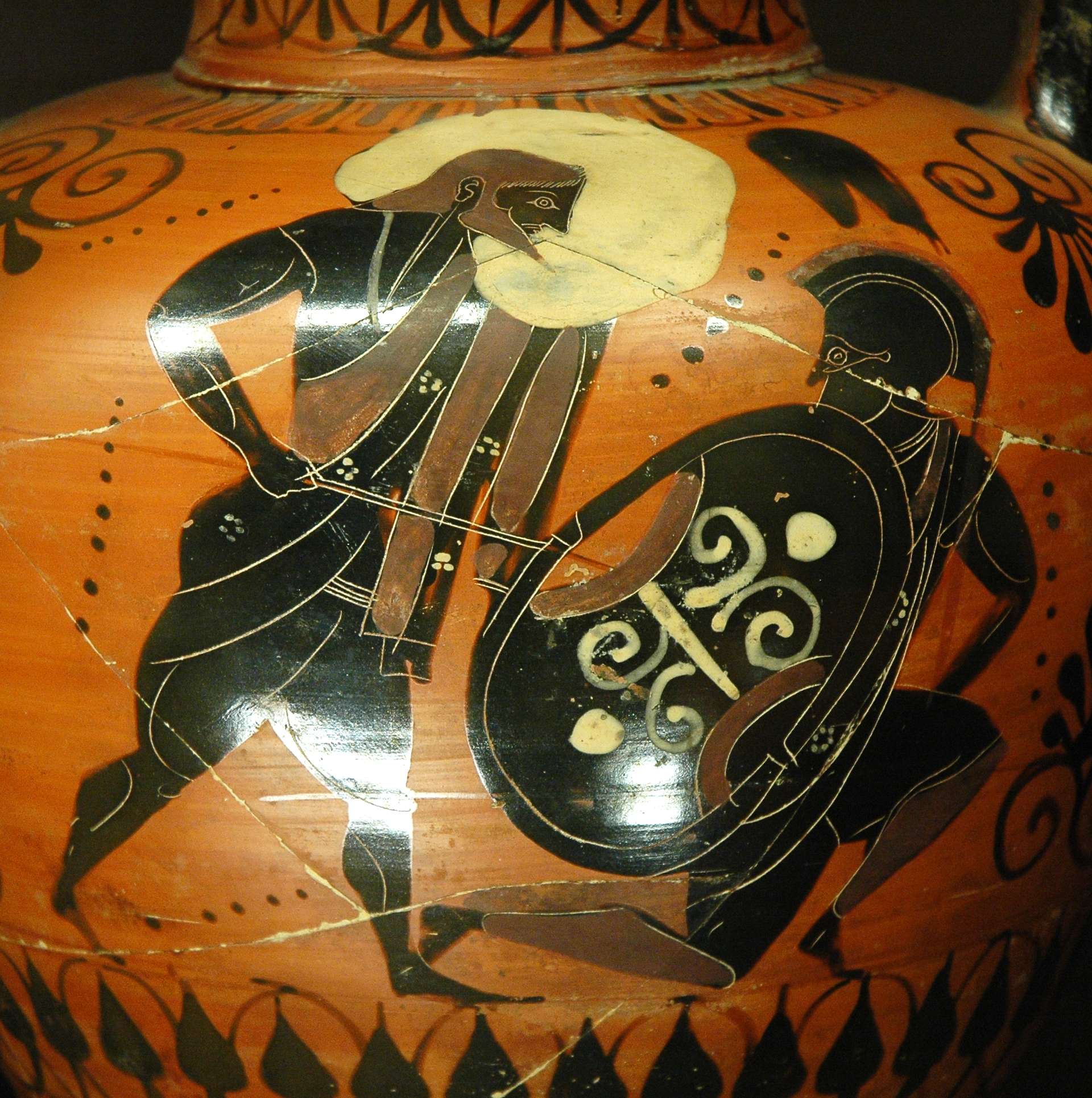
Poseidon versus a Giant (probably Polybotes), black-figure neck amphora c. 550–500 BC (Louvre F226).

In another version of the story, after being struck by Zeus, Polybotes swam away, Poseidon threw a trident at him but missed and the trident became the island of Nisyros or Porphyris.

Polybotes is named on two sixth-century BC black-figure pots. On one, a fragmentary dinos (Getty 81.AE.211), he is opposed by Zeus, identified by an inscription. On the other, an amphora (Louvre E732), he is opposed by Poseidon who is carrying the island of Nisyros on his left shoulder, ready to hurl it against the Giant. The scene depicted on the amphora: Poseidon with trident in his right hand and the island on his left shoulder, moving from left to right, fighting a Giant (mostly unnamed but usually presumed to be Polybotes, although one fifth-century BC example names the Giant Ephialtes) is a frequent occurrence in sixth and fifth-century BC Greek vase paintings.

Polybotes is also possibly named on a late sixth-century early fifth-century BC red-figure cup (Akropolis 2.211). A late fifth-century red-figure cup (Berlin F2531) shows on its interior Poseidon (without Nisyros) attacking Polybotes with his trident, in the presence of Gaia rising from the ground on the left.
