= Temple E (Selinus) =

Coordinates: 37.5866°N 12.8348°E

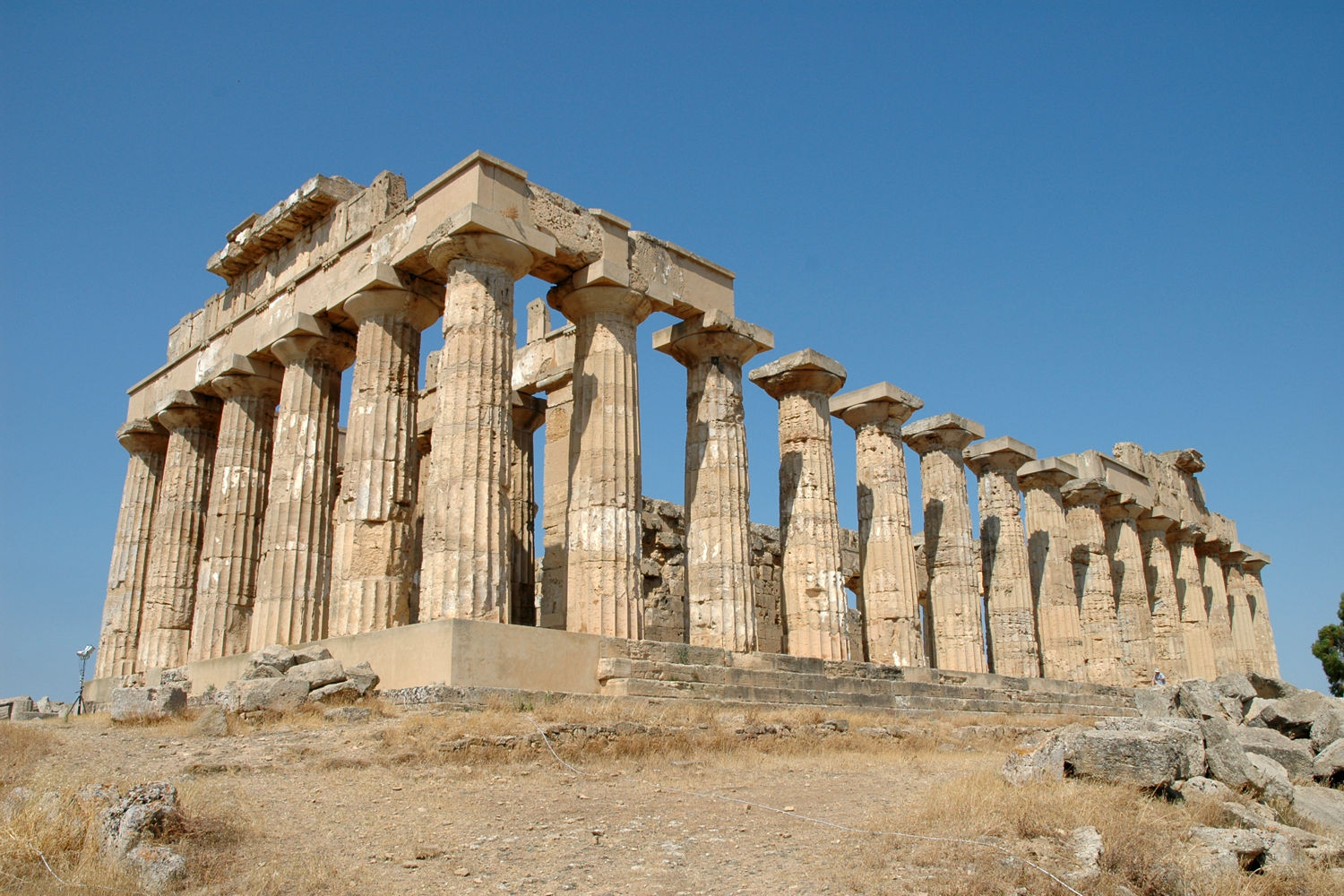
Temple E, also called the Temple of Hera

Temple E at Selinus in Sicily is a Greek temple of Magna Graecia of the Doric order. It is found on the hill to the east of the city's acropolis. Temple E is also known as the Temple of Hera because an inscription found on a votive stela indicates that it was dedicated to Hera; however, some scholars argue that it must have been dedicated to Aphrodite on the basis of structural parallels. It was built towards the middle of the fifth century BC on top of the foundations of a more ancient building. It is the best conserved of the temples of Selinus but its present appearance is the result of anastylosis (reconstruction using original material) performed—controversially—in 1959, by the Italian archaeologist Jole Bovio Marconi.

== Description ==
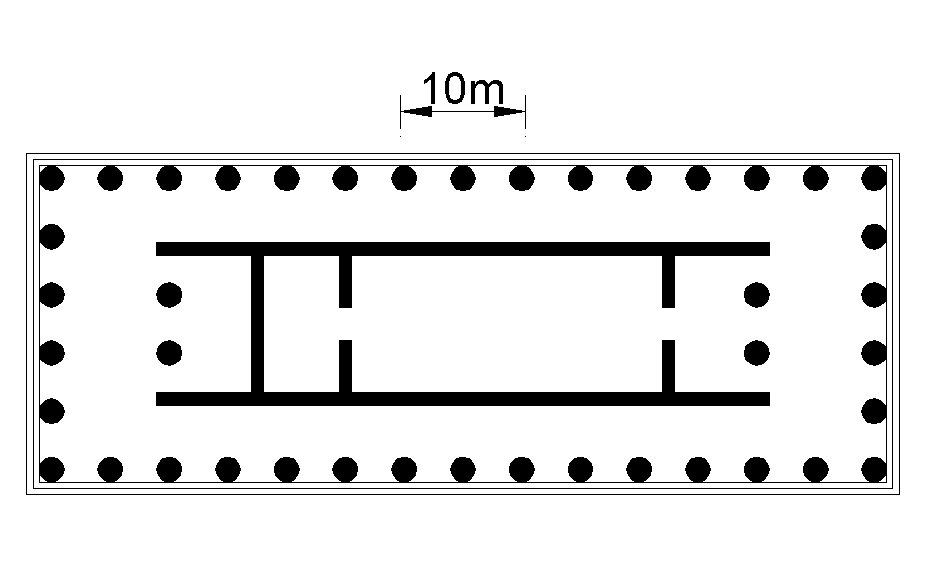
Floor plan

The peripteral temple belongs to the period of transition from the archaic to the classical period. It has a peristyle 25.33 wide x 67.82 metres long with six columns at the front (hexastyle) and fifteen on the long sides. The columns are each 10.19 metres high with numerous traces of the stucco which originally covered them. As a result, the floorplan is unusually elongated. It is a temple characterised by multiple staircases creating a system of successive levels: ten steps lead to the entrance on the eastern side, after the pronaos in antis another six steps lead into the naos and finally another six steps lead into the adyton at the rear of the naos. Behind the adyton, separated from it by a wall, was the opisthodomos in antis. There are many of the optical illusions typical of the Doric order: the strong tapering of the columns at their ends (entasis), contraction at the corners, and widening of the final metopes, for example.

A Doric frieze at the top of the walls of the naos consisted of metopes depicting people, with the heads and naked parts of the women made of Parian marble and the rest from local stone. These metopes date to around 470 BC and show evidence of the evolution towards the classical style. Four metopes are preserved: Heracles killing the Amazon Antiope, the marriage of Hera and Zeus, Actaeon being torn apart by Artemis’ hunting dogs, Athena killing the Giant Enceladus, and another more fragmentary one perhaps depicting Apollo and Daphne. All of them are kept in the Antonino Salinas Regional Archeological Museum.

== Gallery ==
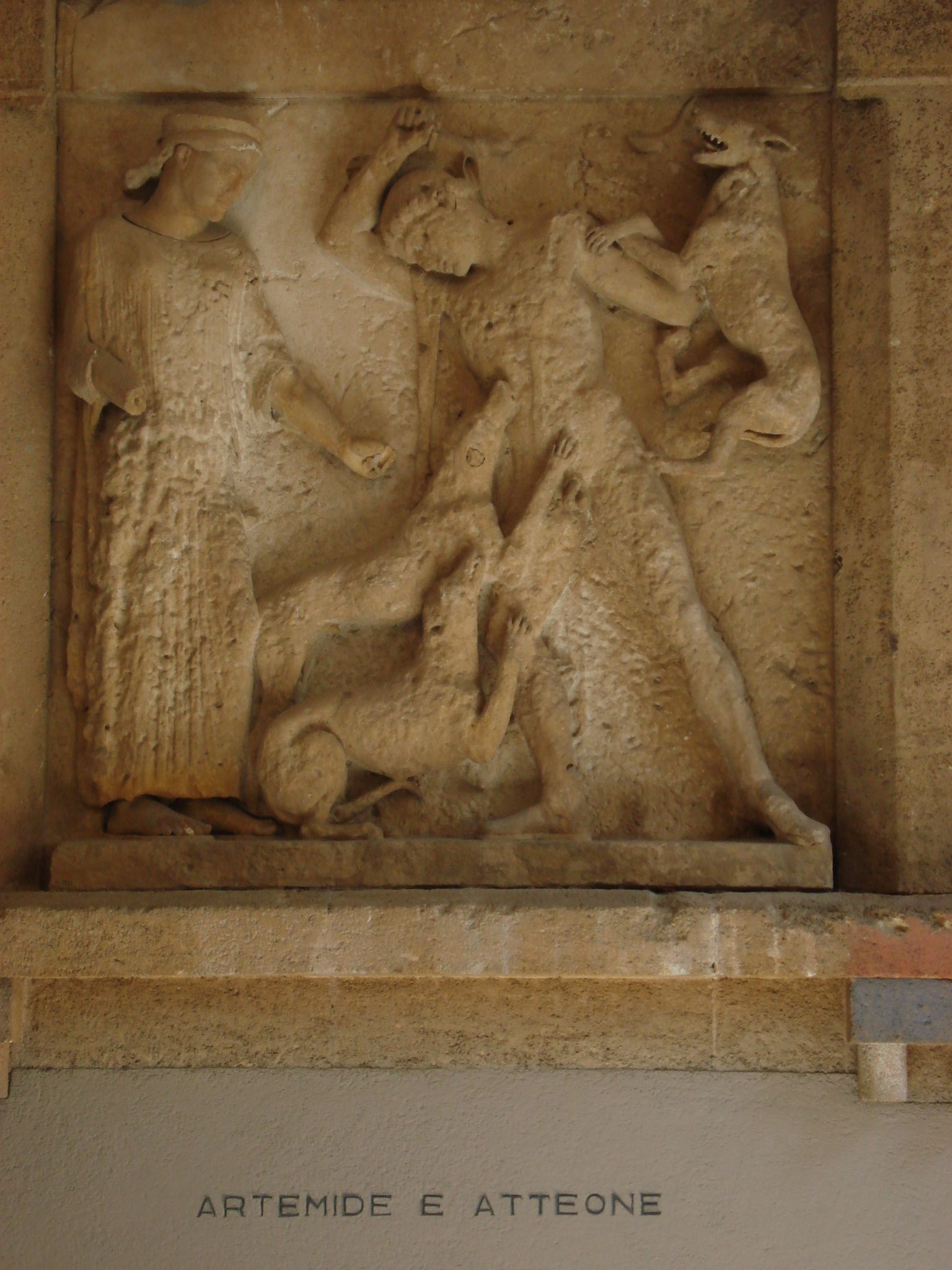
Artemis and Actaeon

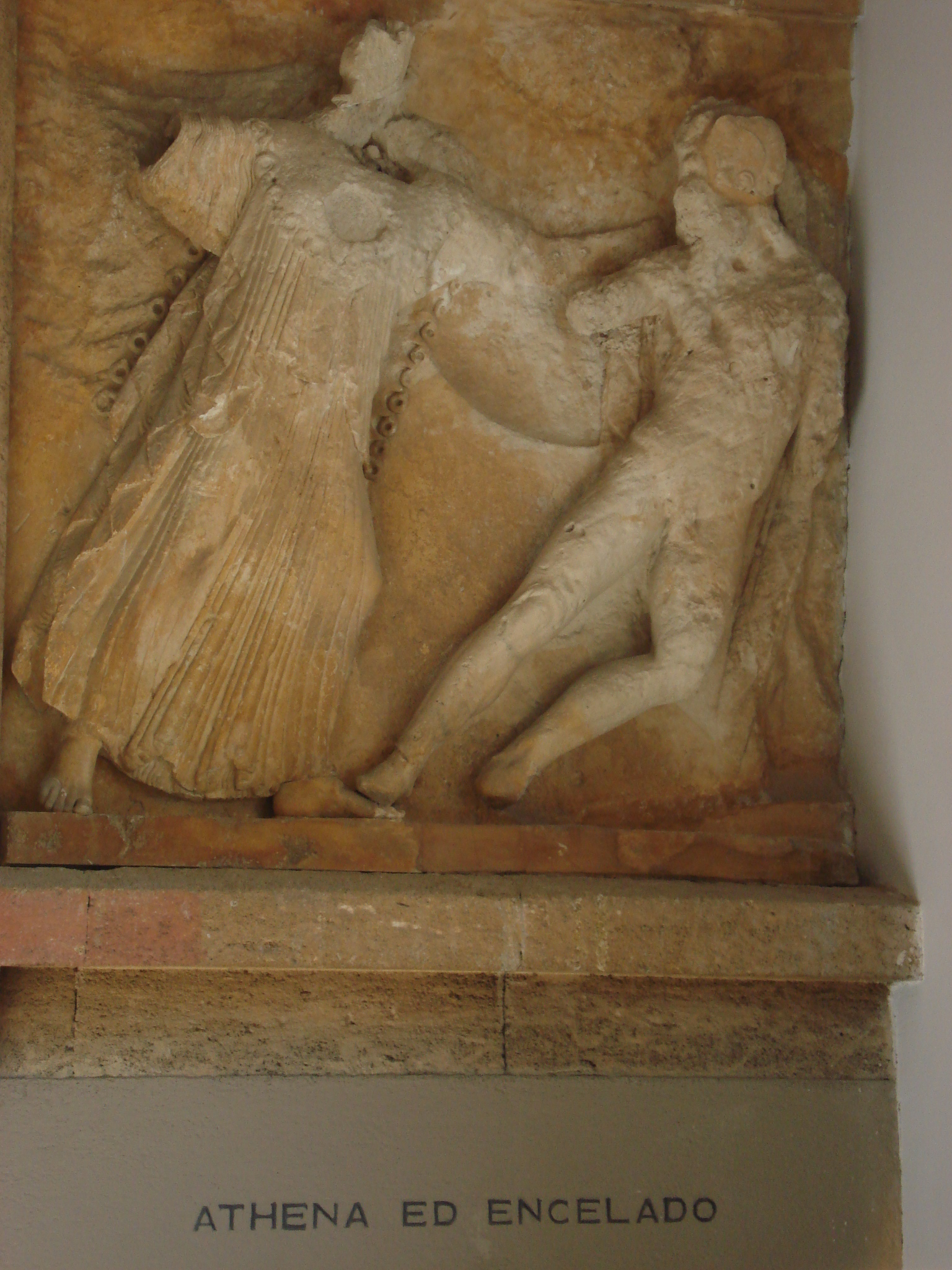
Athena and Enceladus

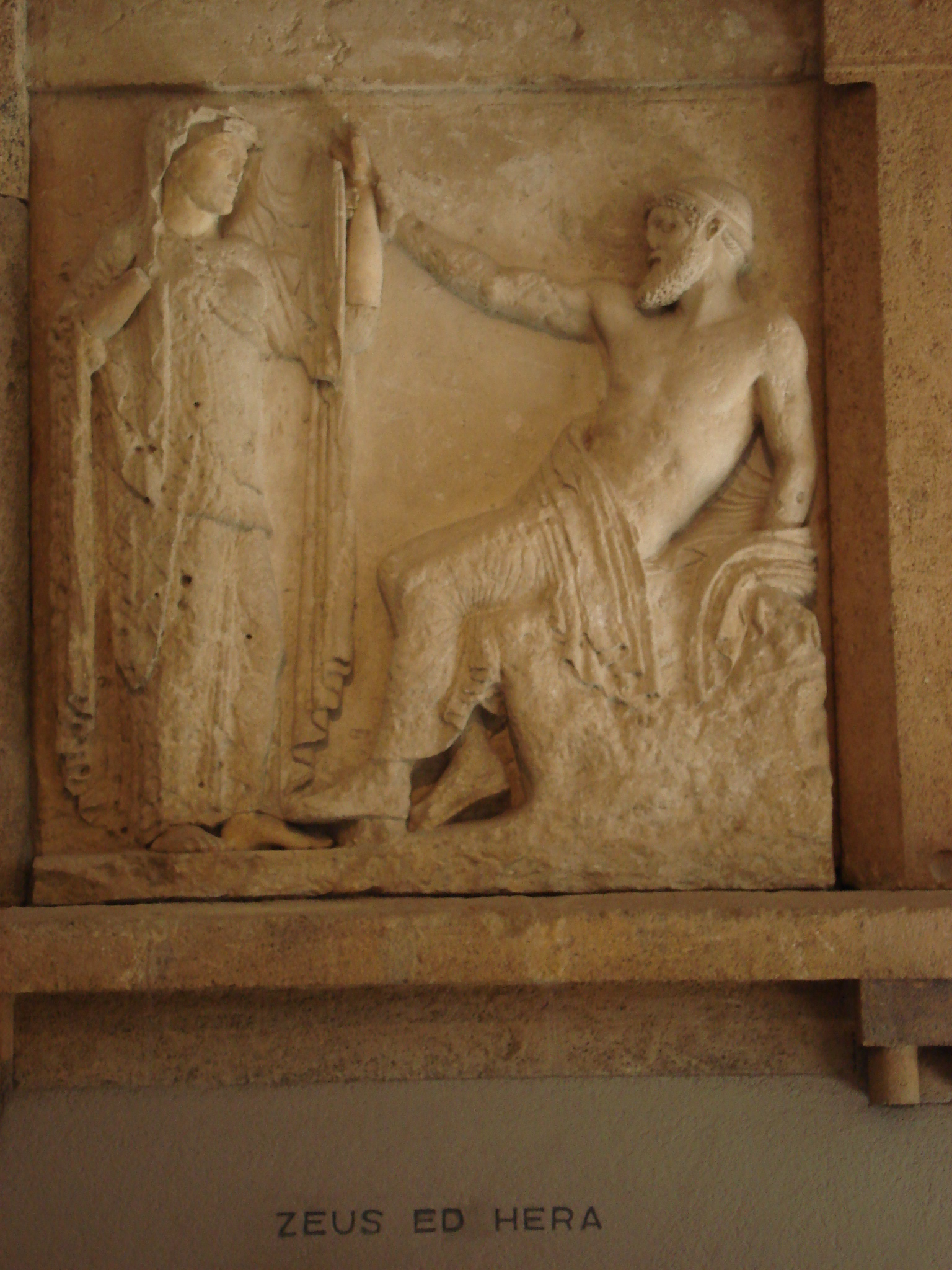
Zeus and Hera

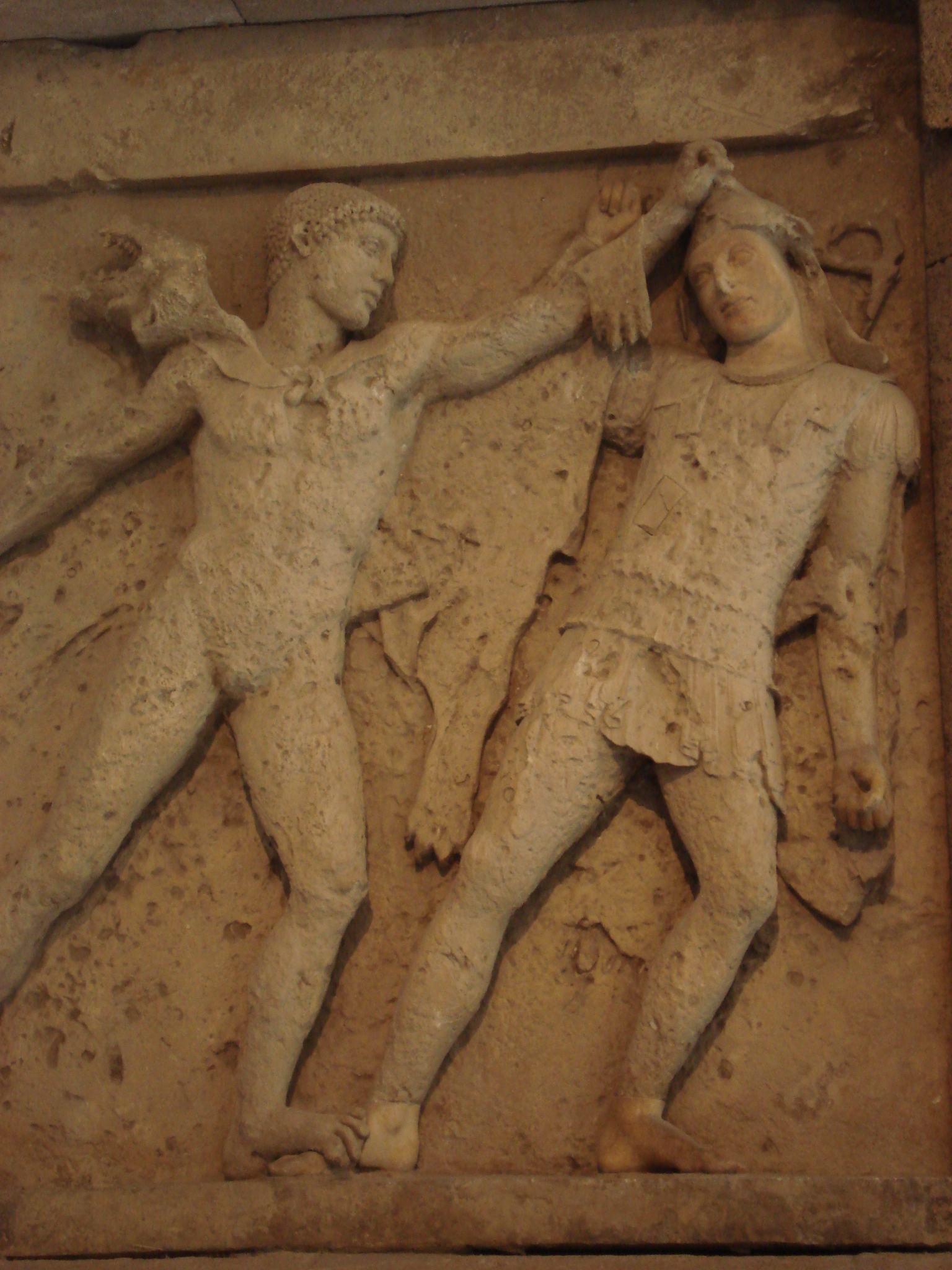
Heracles and Antiope
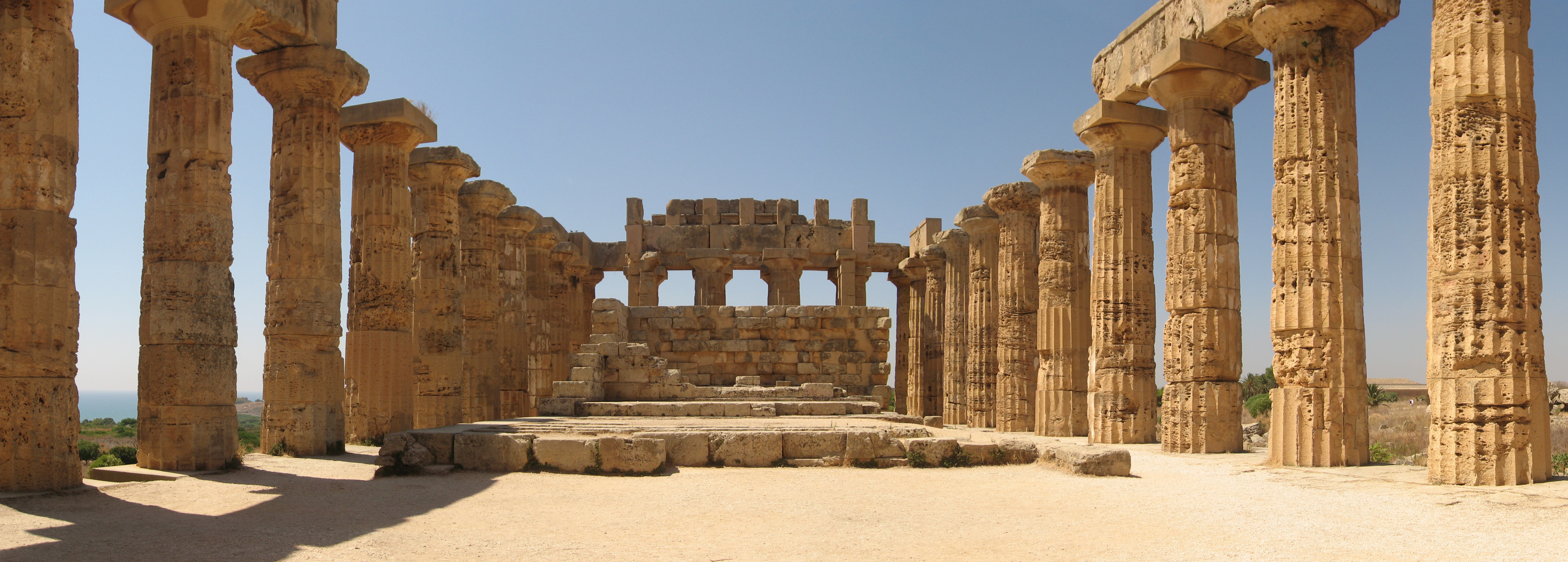
View from within
