= Jole Bovio Marconi =

Italian archaeologist (1897–1986)

Jole Bovio
- Born: January 21, 1897; Rome
- Died: April 14, 1986 (aged 89); Palermo
- Education: Sapienza University of Rome, Italian School of Archaeology at Athens
- Spouse(s): Pirro Marconi, married 1926–1938
- Children: Marina Marconi Causi
- Scientific career
- Fields: archaeology, prehistory
- Workplaces: Regional Archeological Museum Antonio Salinas, University of Palermo

Jole Bovio Marconi (Italian pronunciation: [ˈjɔːle ˈbɔːvjo marˈkoːni]) (Note: Jole is a variant spelling of the Greek name Iole.) (January 21, 1897 in Rome – April 14, 1986 in Palermo) was an Italian archaeologist who graduated with a degree in the topography of ancient Rome from the Sapienza University of Rome and specialized at the Italian School of Archaeology at Athens. She married her colleague Pirro Marconi, whom she met in her studies in Athens.

In the 1920s she moved to Sicily, centering her work on its classical monuments. In 1939 she became the archaeological superintendent for western Sicily.

She devoted herself to writing some publications on the civilization of the Conca d'Oro ('Golden Valley'), the fertile plain among mountains where Sicily's capital city Palermo is situated, and of the Grotta del Vecchiuzzo in Madonie Regional Natural Park. She remained the director of the Archaeological Superintendency of Western Sicily from the 1930s to the 1960s. In 1964, she was awarded the gold medal for merit in culture, art and education by the Ministry of Public Education and was designated a "Commander of the Republic".

During World War II she took charge of moving the exhibits kept at Palermo's Regional Archeological Museum Antonio Salinas by personally relocating them to the convent of San Martino delle Scale in Monreale; in view of the great devastation that the museum suffered, this allowed them to save the greater part of the collection.

At the end of the war she was in charge of the museum's reconstruction and reorganization, so much so that if Antonio Salinas is the one who created the museum, Jole Bovio Marconi is considered the one who created it anew. She excavated and studied the Upper Paleolithic Grotta del Genovese on Levanzo in the Egadi Islands and Grotta dell'Addaura near Palermo (published in 1953). She was entrusted with the chair of prehistory at the University of Palermo, and she took charge of the restoration of the temple of Segesta. She planned and realized the anastylosis of Temple E in Selinunte.

In 1963 she published the first paper on the late Neolithic to early Bronze Age Bell Beaker ware of Sicily, "Sulla diffusione del vaso campaniforme in Sicilia" (Kokalos 9, pp. 93–128).

In recognition of this work, the archaeologists Jean Guilaine, Sebastiano Tusa, and Primo Veneroso dedicated to her memory the paper La Sicile et l'Europe Campaniforme, with funds from the Collège de France. Later in 1996, ten years after her death, the leadership of the Regional Archeological Museum Antonio Salinas named the prehistoric wing of the museum after her.
