= Palermo Fragment =

Marble fragment from the Acropolis of Athens, removed by Lord Elgin

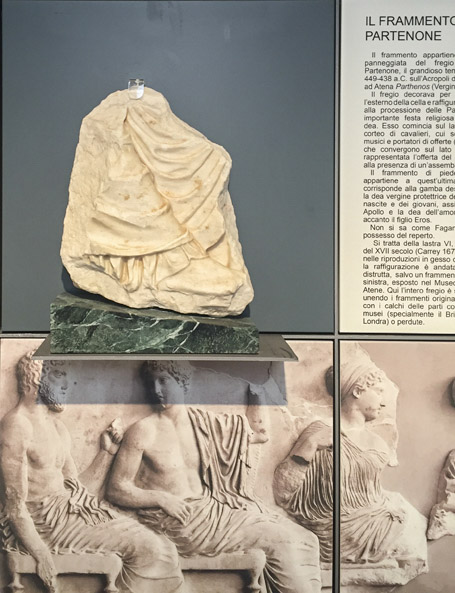
Fragment from a Parthenon frieze, known as the Palermo fragment, at the Salinas Archaeological Museum, Palermo

The Palermo fragment, also known as Fagan slab from the name of the artist and British consul Robert Fagan who owned it, is a 2,500-year-old marble sculpture fragment of the foot and dress of the ancient Greek goddess Artemis from the continuous frieze of the Parthenon in Athens.

The Palermo fragment was taken by Lord Elgin from the Parthenon in the early 19th century and given to the British Consul to Sicily in 1816. Upon the death of Robert Fagan, the fragment was sold by his wife to the University of Palermo, whose collection was later deposited into what would later become the Salinas Archaeological Museum in Palermo.. The fragment, at first generically attributed to the classical period, was recognised as one of the missing fragments of the Panathenaic Frieze of the Parthenon by classical scholar Walther Amelung.

Greece's 13-year campaign for the return of the fragment ended on 24 September 2008, when Italian President Giorgio Napolitano delivered the fragment to Athens on a temporary loan. This move was anticipated to strengthen Greece's request for the British Museum to return the Elgin Marbles. In 2022, the fragment was permanently returned to the Acropolis Museum, where it has been reunited with the rest of the Parthenon frieze. The Salinas Archaeological Museum in Palermo is one of three collections to have returned Parthenon fragments to Greece.
