= Enceladus (Giant) =

Greek mythological figure

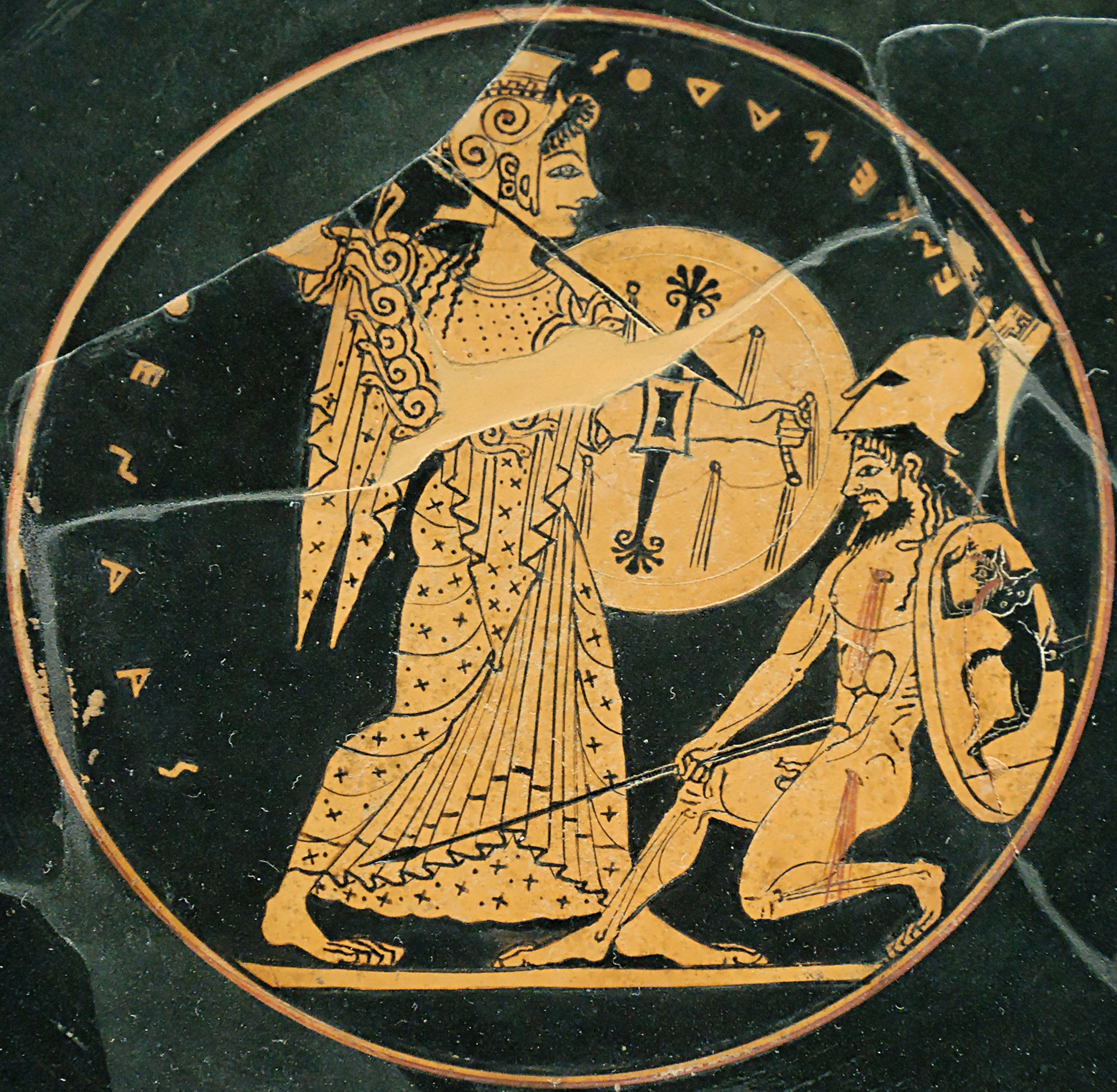
Athena (left) fighting Enceladus (inscribed retrograde) on an Attic red-figure dish, c. 530 BC (Louvre CA3662)

In Greek mythology, Enceladus (Ancient Greek: Ἐγκέλαδος, romanized: Enkélados) was one of the Giants, the offspring of Gaia (Earth) and Uranus (Sky). Enceladus was the traditional opponent of Athena during the Gigantomachy, the war between the Giants and the gods, and was said to be buried under Mount Etna in Sicily.

== Mythology ==
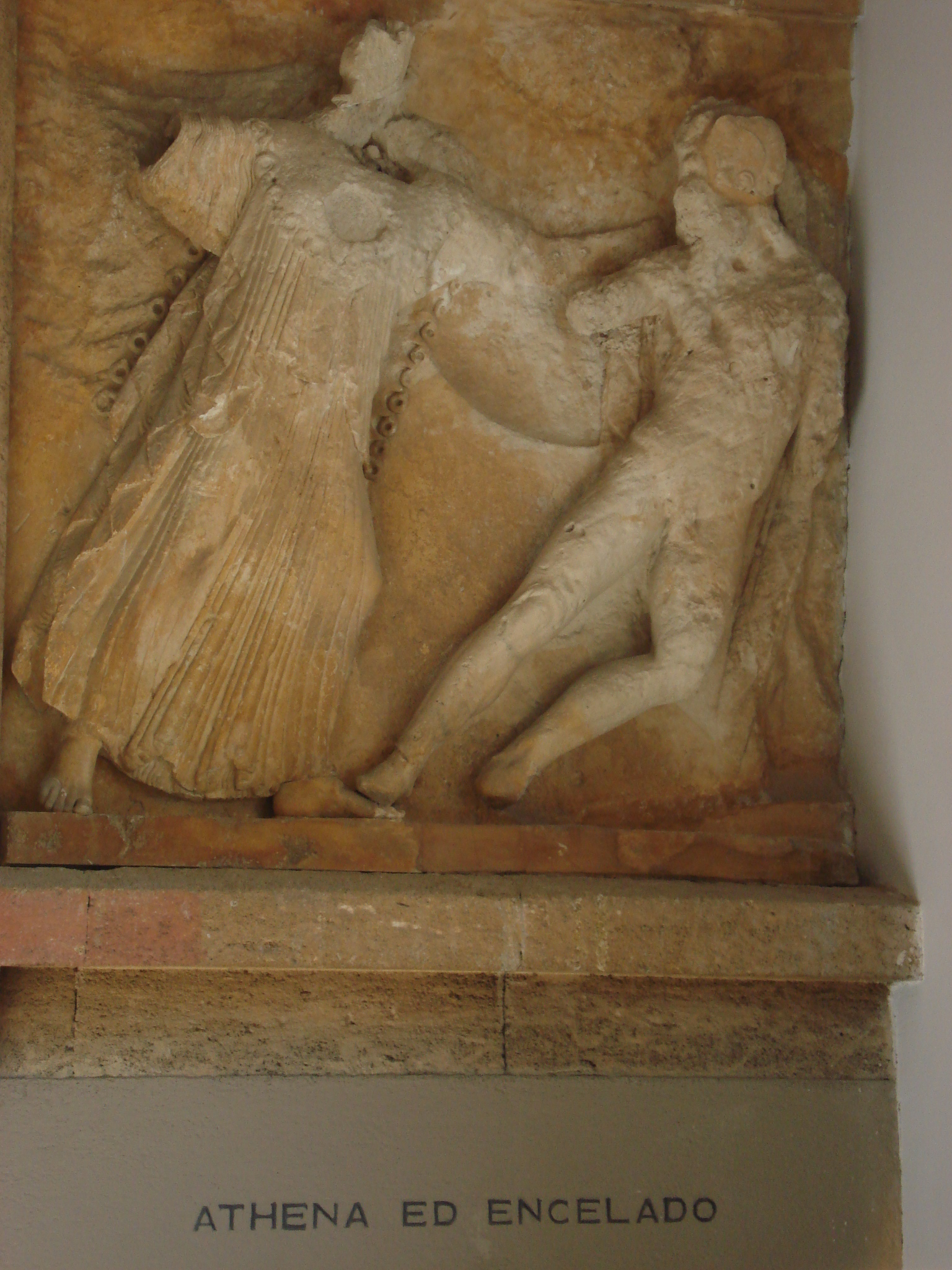
Athena and Giant (presumably Enceladus), Temple E (Selinus).

Enceladus was one of the Giants, who (according to Hesiod) were the offspring of Gaia, born from the blood that fell when Uranus was castrated by their son Cronus. The Giants fought Zeus and the other Olympian gods in the Gigantomachy, their epic battle for control of the cosmos. A Giant named Enceladus, fighting Athena, is attested in art as early as an Attic black-figure pot dating from the second quarter of the sixth century BC (Louvre E732). In literature, references to the Giant occur as early as the plays of the fifth-century BC Greek tragedian Euripides, where, for example, in Euripides' Ion, the chorus describes seeing on the late sixth-century Temple of Apollo at Delphi, Athena "brandishing her gorgon shield against Enceladus". Although traditionally opposed by Athena, Virgil and others have Enceladus being struck down by Zeus. In Euripides' comic satyr play Cyclops, Silenus, the drunken companion of the wine god Dionysus, boasts of having killed Enceladus with his spear.

The third-century BC poet Callimachus has Enceladus buried under the island of Sicily, and according to the mythographer Apollodorus, Athena hurled the island of Sicily at the fleeing Enceladus during the Gigantomachy. The Latin poets Virgil, Statius and Claudian all locate his burial under Mount Etna, although other traditions had the monster Typhon or the Hundred-Hander Briareus buried under Etna. For some Enceladus was instead buried in Italy.

The Latin poet Horace has Enceladus use trees as spears. The second-century geographer Pausanias reports that a Tegean statue of Athena was called "horse goddess" because, according to a local account, Athena "drove the chariot and horses against Enceladus". Claudian calls Enceladus "all powerful king of the Earth-born giants", and has Gaia, imagining the Giants victorious, propose that "Enceladus, rule the sea".

== The Dionysiaca ==
The fifth-century Greek poet Nonnus, in his poem Dionysiaca, mentions Enceladus as one of the several Giants that Dionysus battles in the Gigantomachy. Nonnus has Gaia set the Giants against Dionysus, promising Enceladus Athena as his wife should the Giants subdue Dionysus. Dionysus fought Enceladus with fire, but Enceladus was ultimately defeated by Zeus:

"[Dionysus] roasted the Giants' bodies with a great conflagration, an image on earth of the thunderbolt cast by Zeus. The torches blazed: fire was rolling all over the head of Encelados and making the air hot, but it did not vanquish him—Encelados bent not his knee in the steam of the earthly fire, since he was reserved for a thunderbolt."

== Cause of volcanic eruptions and earthquakes ==
Enceladus—like Typhon, Briareus and other vanquished monsters thought to be buried under volcanos—was said to be the cause of earthquakes and volcanic eruptions. Mount Etna's eruptions were said to be the breath of Enceladus, and its tremors to be caused by him rolling over from side to side beneath the mountain. So, for example Virgil:

Enceladus, his body lightning-scarred,
lies prisoned under all, so runs the tale:
o'er him gigantic Aetna breathes in fire
from crack and seam; and if he haply turn
to change his wearied side, Trinacria's isle
trembles and moans, and thick fumes mantle heaven.

the c. 1st-century poem Aetna (perhaps written by Lucilius Junior):

In Trinacrian waters Enceladus dies and is buried under Aetna by Jove's decree; with the ponderous mountain above him he tosses restlessly, and defiantly breathes from his throat a penal fire.

and Claudian:

In the midst of the island rise the charred cliffs of Aetna, eloquent monument of Jove’s victory over the Giants, the tomb of Enceladus, whose bound and bruisèd body breathes forth endless sulphur clouds from its burning wounds. Whene’er his rebellious shoulders shift their burden to the right or left, the island is shaken from its foundations and the walls of tottering cities sway this way and that.

== Iconography ==
The battle between Athena and Enceladus was a popular theme in Greek vase paintings, with examples from as early as the middle of the sixth century BC. From the description given in Euripides' Ion, the battle was apparently depicted on the late sixth-century BC Temple of Apollo at Delphi.

The east pediment of the Old Temple of Athena on the Acropolis of Athens, dating from the late sixth century, prominently displayed Athena standing over a fallen giant, possibly Enceladus. The battle was probably also depicted on the new peplos (robe) presented to Athena on the Acropolis of Athens as part of the Panathenaic festival.

== In later art and literature ==
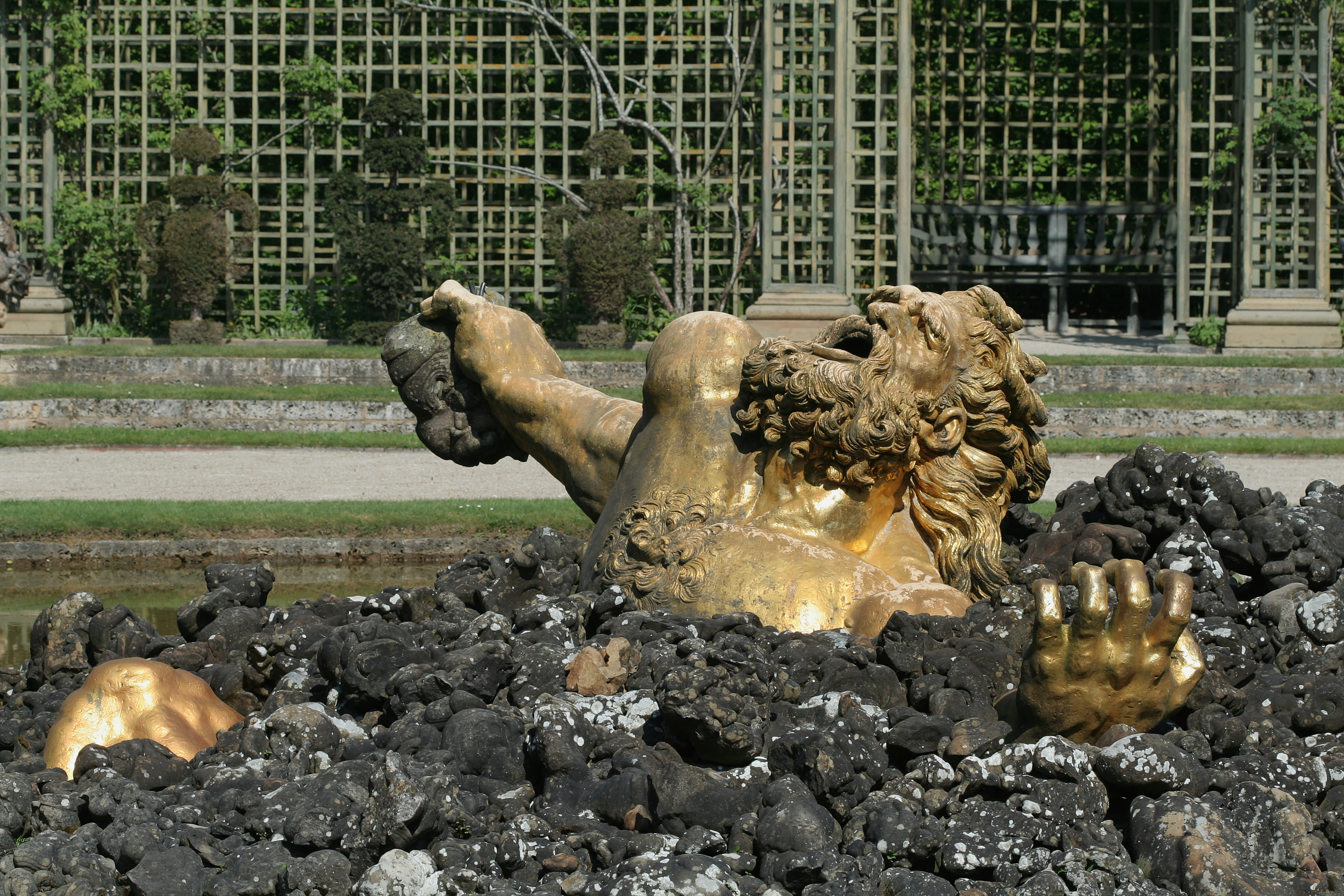
Gilt-bronze Enceladus by Gaspar Mercy in the Bosquet de l'Encélade in the gardens of Versailles

At Versailles, Louis XIV's consistent iconographic theme of the triumphs of Apollo and the Olympians against all adversaries included the fountain of Enceladus in its own cabinet de verdure, the Bosquet de l'Encélade, which was cut into the surrounding woodland and outlined by trelliswork; the ensemble has recently been restored. According to an engraving of the fountain by Le Pautre (1677), the sculptor of the gilt-bronze Enceladus was Gaspar Mercy of Cambrai.

William Shakespeare mentions "Enceladus" in Titus Andronicus, Act 4, sc. 2, L 96. "I tell you younglings, not Enceladus."

John Keats mentions Enceladus among the Titans in his "Hyperion" (1818/1819).

Porthos is likened to Enceladus when he is buried in a rock fall in The Man in the Iron Mask by Alexandre Dumas.

In Herman Melville's Pierre, the image of Enceladus appears multiple times; the protagonist identifies with Enceladus in a dream.

Henry Wadsworth Longfellow, inspired by the suffering of the Second Italian War of Independence, wrote his poem "Enceladus" in 1859.

== Namesakes ==
Enceladus, a moon of the planet Saturn, is named after the mythological Enceladus. Its south pole is interspersed with massive cryovolcanic plumes of ice and water vapor that shoot hundreds of miles from its interior. The moon is considered by scientists to be one of the most likely locations in the Solar System to offer some habitability potential for microscopic life.

One of two surviving Short Belfast military transport aircraft is dubbed "Enceladus".

In Antarctica, there is a grouping of nunataks (ridge) on Alexander Island called the Enceladus Nunataks—but these nunataks were named after Saturn's moon, not after the giants of Greek mythology.

The Finnish eSports organisation ENCE takes its name from Enceladus.
