= Pirro Marconi =

Italian archaeologist (1897–1938)

Pirro Marconi (1 January 1897, Verona - 30 April 1938, Formia) was an Italian archaeologist.

== Biography ==
Pirro Marconi was born on New Year's Day in 1897 to Antonella Levi and the violinist Pietro Marconi. He enrolled in the University of Rome to study letters but interrupted his studies in May 1915 to volunteer with the Alpini, becoming an officer during World War I. After the war, he received two silver medals and resumed his studies, graduating in July 1920 with a thesis on the sculptural representations of Antinous, marking the first significant work on the subject since Lorentz Dietrichson's in 1884.

He later attended the Archaeological School of Rome where he met his future wife and colleague, Jole Bovio. From 1923 to 1924, both archaeologists were fellows at the Italian Archaeological School in Athens, where Marconi also obtained a degree in philosophy.

In 1926, he became a lecturer in archaeology and worked as an inspector for the Soprintendenza in eastern Veneto. He later worked in Sicily at the Archaeological Museum of Palermo, and also taught at the University of Cagliari and Federico II University of Naples, where he mentored Alfonso De Franciscis. In 1936, he was entrusted with leading archaeological excavations in Albania.

Marconi died in a plane crash, on 30 April 1938, returning from Albania.

== Publications ==
- Agrigento, Topografie ed Arte. Vallecchi Editore, Florenz 1929.
- Agrigento arcaica: il santuario delle divinita chtonie e il tempio detto di Vulcano. Società Magna Grecia, Rom 1933.
- Agrigento. Rom 1933. 2. Auflage 1949 (Itinerari dei musei, gallerie e monumenti d’Italia / Ministero della Pubblica Istruzione 26).
