= Antonino Salinas Regional Archaeological Museum =

Archaeological Museum in Palermo, Italy

Antonino Salinas Regional Archeological Museum
- Museo Archeologico Regionale Antonino Salinas
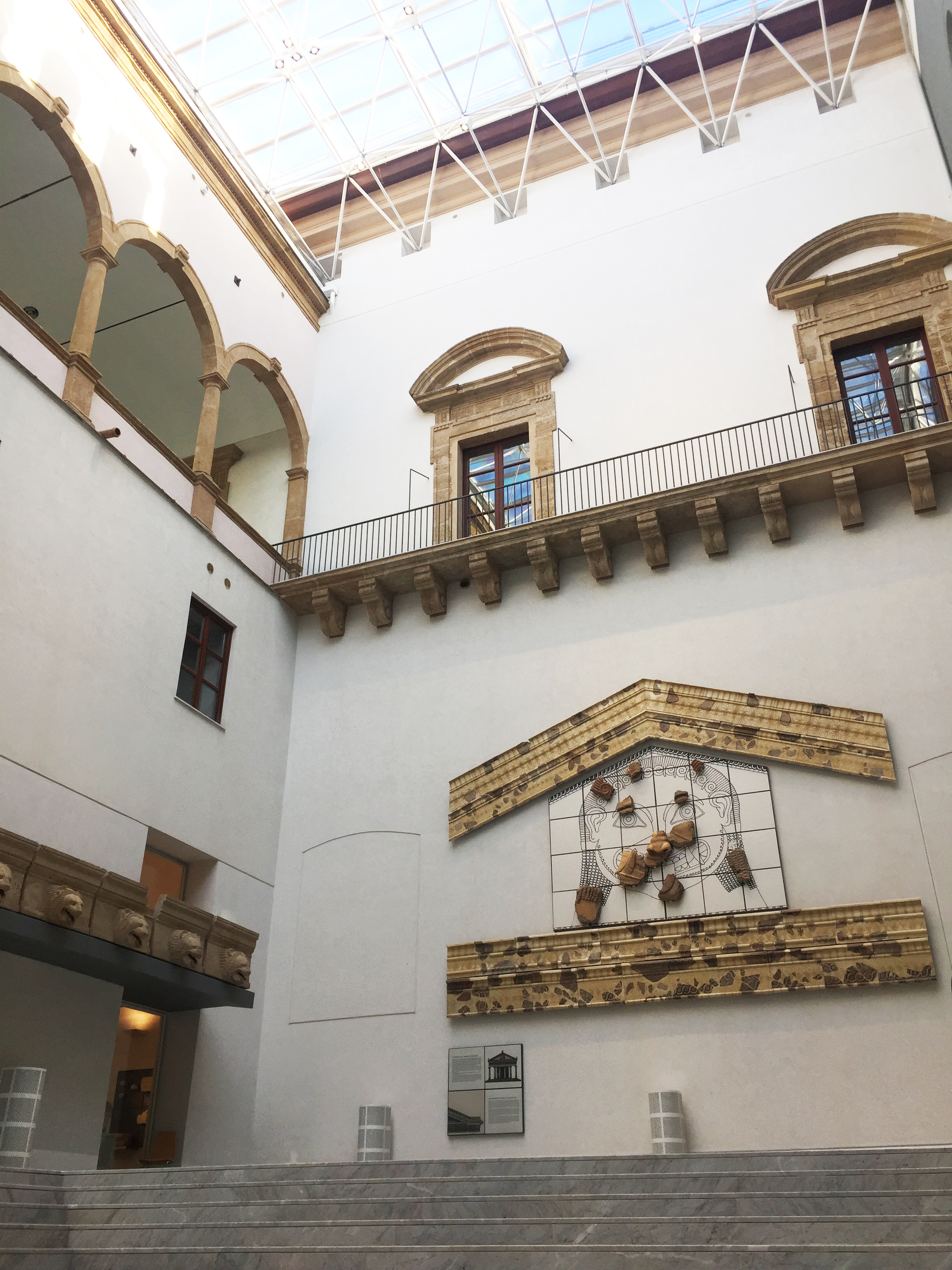
- "Agorà" courtyard

- Location within Italy
- Established: 1873
- Location: Via Bara all'Olivella 24, Palermo, Italy
- Coordinates: 38°07′15″N 13°21′38″E
- Collection size: Archeology
- Website: www.regione.sicilia.it/beniculturali/salinas/

The Antonino Salinas Regional Archeological Museum (Italian: Museo Archeologico Regionale Antonino Salinas) is a museum in Palermo, Italy. It possesses one of the richest collections of Punic and Ancient Greek art in Italy, as well as many items related to the history of Sicily. Formerly the property of the Oratory of Saint Philip Neri, the museum is named after Antonino Salinas, an archaeologist and numismatist from Palermo, who had served as its director from 1873 until his death in 1914, upon which he left it his major private collection. It is part of the Olivella monumental complex, which includes the Church of Sant'Ignazio all'Olivella and the adjoining Oratory.

== History ==
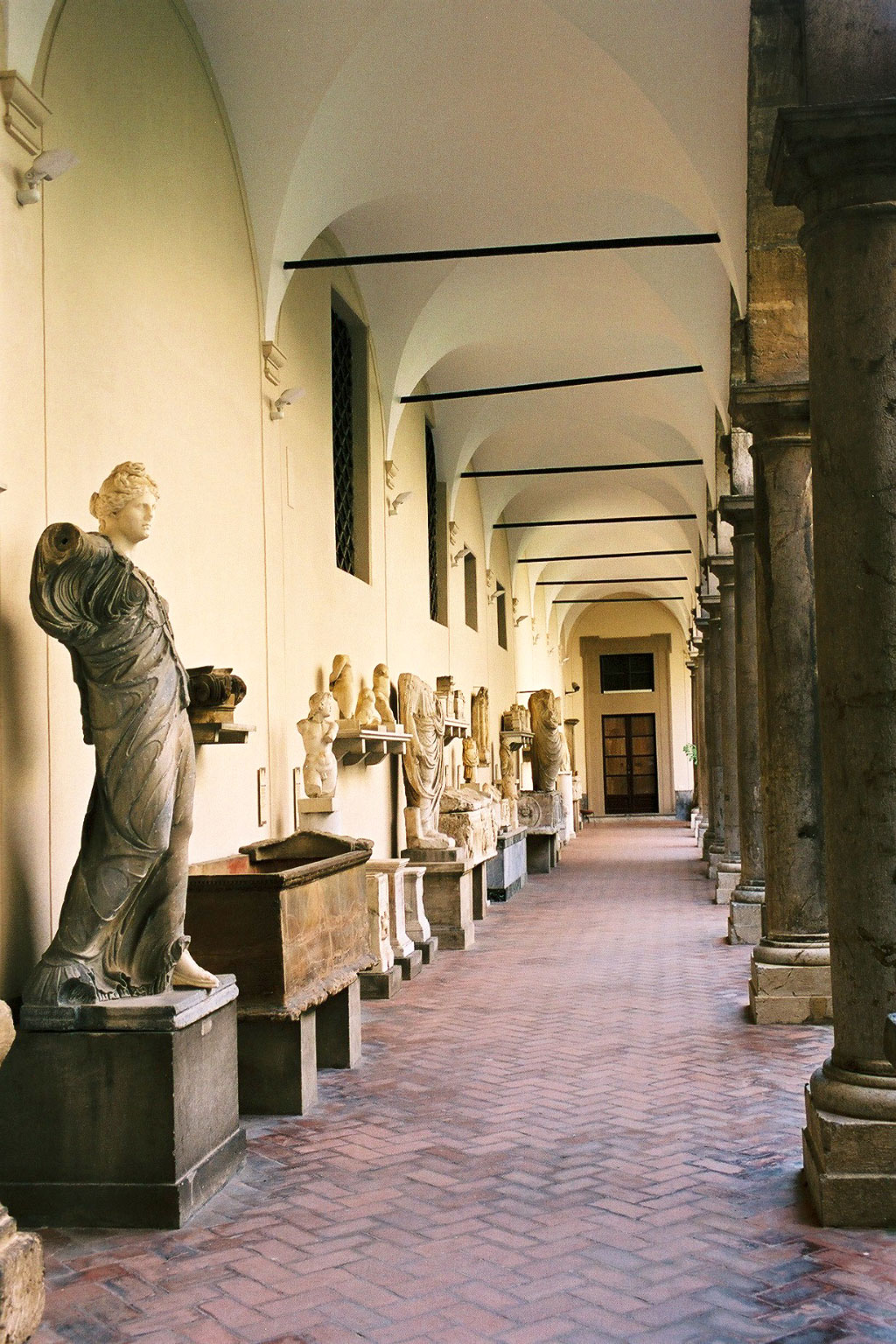
Lapidarium in the cloister

The construction of the Olivella complex began in the late 16th century by the architect Antonio Muttone for the Oratory of Saint Philip Neri and was completed in the 17th century. Following the law on the suppression of religious orders of 1866, the building was confiscated and became home to the museum.

During the Second World War, the director of the museum, Jole Bovio Marconi, moved all the material held in the museum to the Abbey of San Martino delle Scale near Monreale. This saved the collection from destruction by the bombing during the Allied invasion of Sicily. In 1949, Bovio Marconi was made responsible for the redevelopment of the museum, as the building was heavily damaged. The building was renovated by architect William De Angelis D'Ossat. From 18 July 2011, the museum was closed for renovation. As of 2026, all three floors of the museum are open to the public with tickets costing up to €10.

== Sections ==
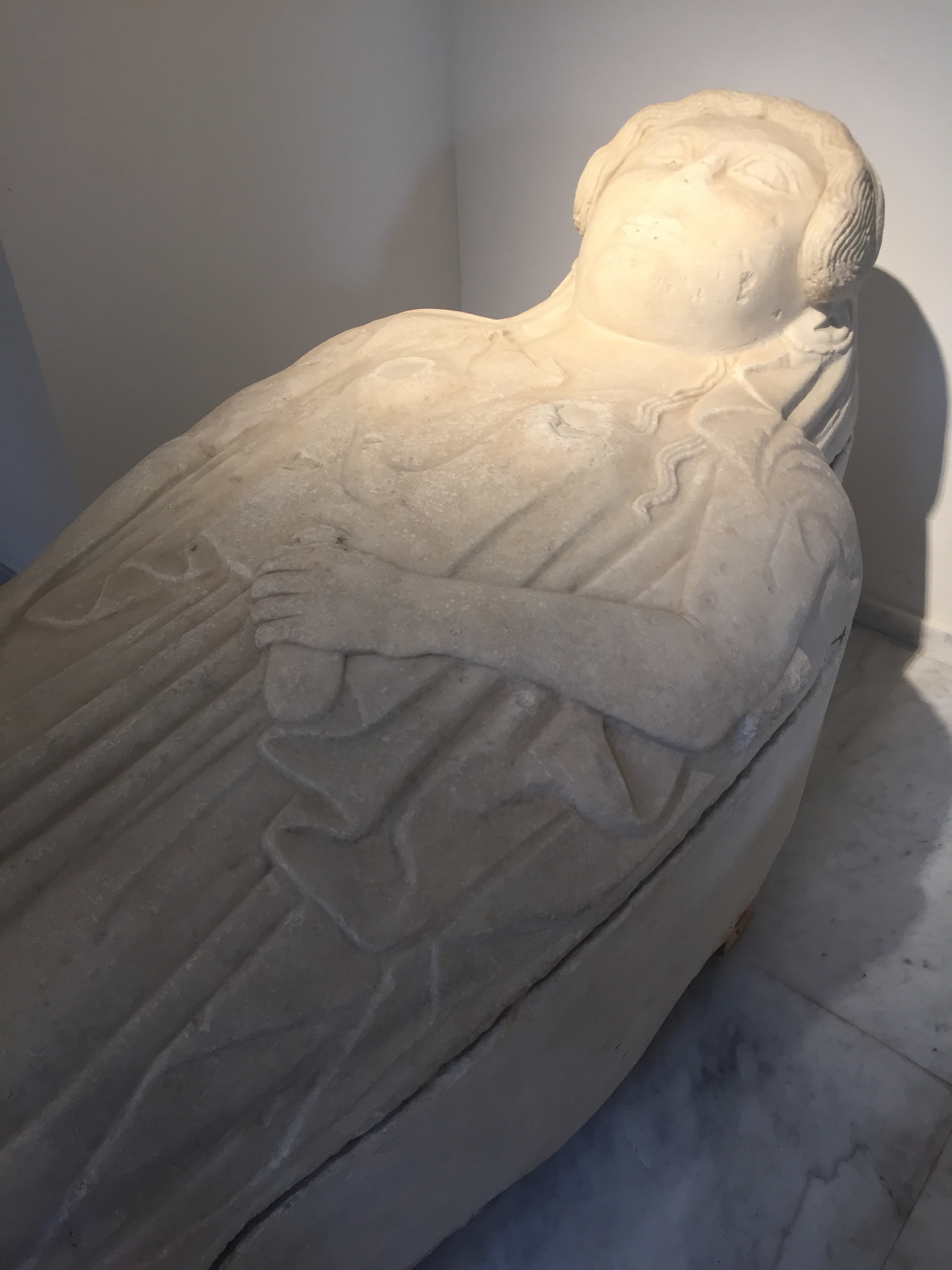
Sarcophagus of Pizzo Cannita

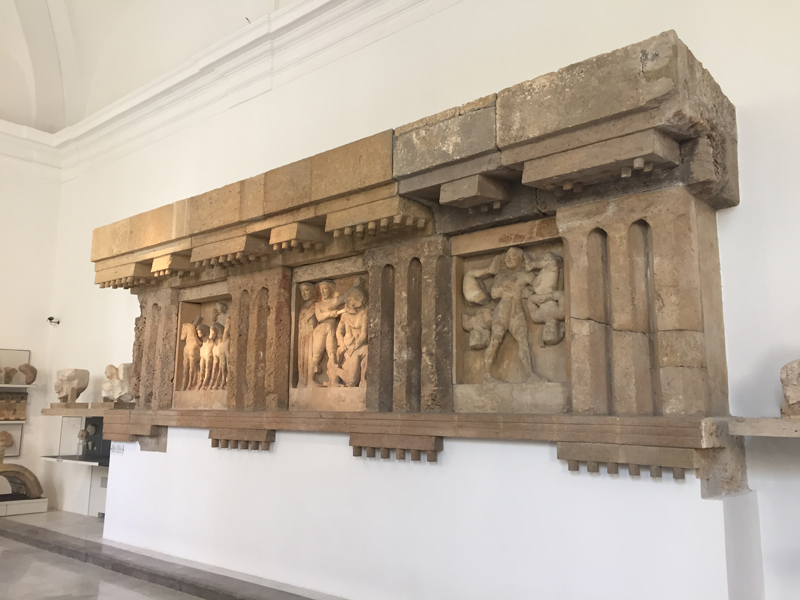
Metope of Temple C in Selinunte

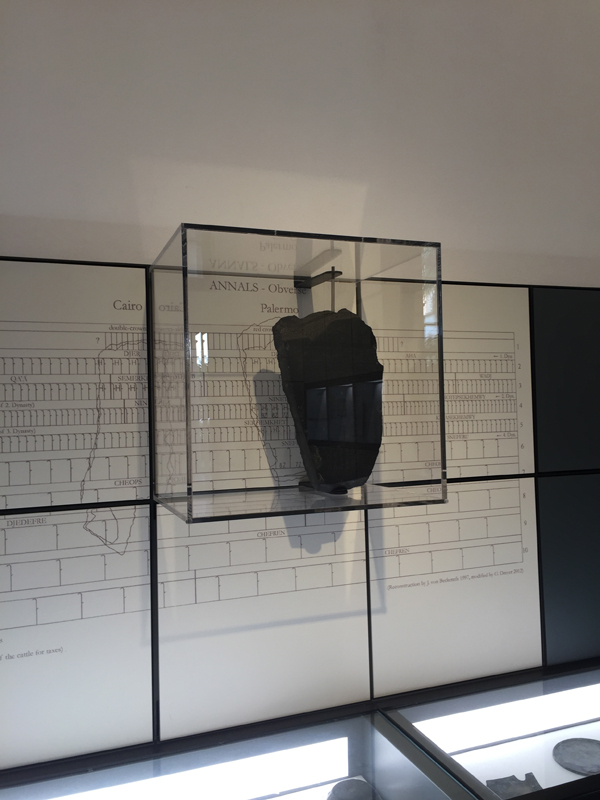
The Palermo Stone

On the ground floor, a section is dedicated to the artefacts found underwater, including materials that were part of the cargo of vessels, stone anchors, strains of lead, lamps, amphoras, and inscriptions ranging from the culture of the Phoenicians to that of the Romans.

The Phoenician section displays two large anthropomorphic sarcophagi of the 5th century BC from the necropolis of Pizzo Cannita (near modern Misilmeri). There are also sculptures of gods and Phoenician votive stelae from Mozia and Lilybaeum.

A reconstruction of the east pediment of the archaeological site of Selinunte is exhibited, displaying the Gorgon of Temple C, several metopes with mythological reliefs (Temples C and E), and sculptures of the archaic and classical period. In 1823, two British architects, Samuel Angell and William Harris, ventured to excavate at Selinunte in the course of their tour of Sicily, and came upon many fragments of sculptured metopes from the Archaic temple now known as "Temple C". Although local officials tried to stop them, they continued their work and attempted to export their finds to England, destined for the British Museum. Now in the shadow of the activities of Lord Elgin, Angell and Harris's shipments were diverted to Palermo, where they remain to this day in the Archaeological Museum.

Artifacts from Himera are on display, as well as objects and sculptures from Solunto, Megara Hyblaea, Tindari, Kamarina, and Agrigento. Among the most important works of art are the great Ram bronze of the third century BC from Syracuse, a Roman copy of a sculpture by Lysippus depicting Heracles catching the Ceryneian Hind and a Roman copy of a marble statue by Praxiteles depicting a satyr.

The Roman period is documented by a collection of sculptures and mosaics found in villas from Piazza Vittoria in Palermo, where the center of the Roman city was previously located. Even prehistoric cultures present in the caves around the territory of Palermo are exhibited in the museum.

== Collections ==
The museum is composed in part by private collections purchased or donated to the museum over the centuries. It also includes the Palermo stone, a portion of a large ancient Egyptian stelae.

=== University Museum collection ===
This is the oldest collection of the museum, which was acquired in 1814 when Giuseppe Emanuele Ventimiglia, Prince of Belmonte, left his collection to the University of Palermo at his death. The university in turn sold it to the museum.

=== Antonino Salinas collection ===
Left to the museum in 1914, this collection is the largest in size with 6, 641 pieces and led to the museum being renamed after Salinas. The collection consists of books, manuscripts, prints, photographs, personal items, and about 6,000 coins.

=== Pietro Bonci Casuccini collection ===
This is the Etruscan collection, which consists of sarcophagi, gravestones, urns, and Attic black and red-figure pottery. It is considered the most important Etruscan collection outside of Tuscany. The exhibits come from Chiusi as part of the excavations carried out in the estates of Count Pietro Bonci Casuccini.

The collection was put up for sale by the grandsons of the founder, Ottavio and Pietro. The sale of the collection was prevented by the Kingdom of Italy in 1863, by the intervention of Michele Amari, who was Minister of Education at the time. The state acquired the collection and transferred it to the Regional Archeological Museum of Palermo.

== Return of Parthenon fragment ==
In 2022, the Antonino Salinas Regional Archaeological Museum returned permanently to Athens a small fragment of the Parthenon. This fragment of the foot of the goddess Artemis had been sold to the University of Palermo by the widow of the British consul Robert Fagan. According to legal scholar Catharine Titi, there is no clear explanation of how Fagan obtained the fragment: although it is possible that the fragment may originally have gone "astray" from Elgin's collection, in reality how it "came to be in Fagan’s possession is, frankly, anyone’s guess".

== Gallery ==
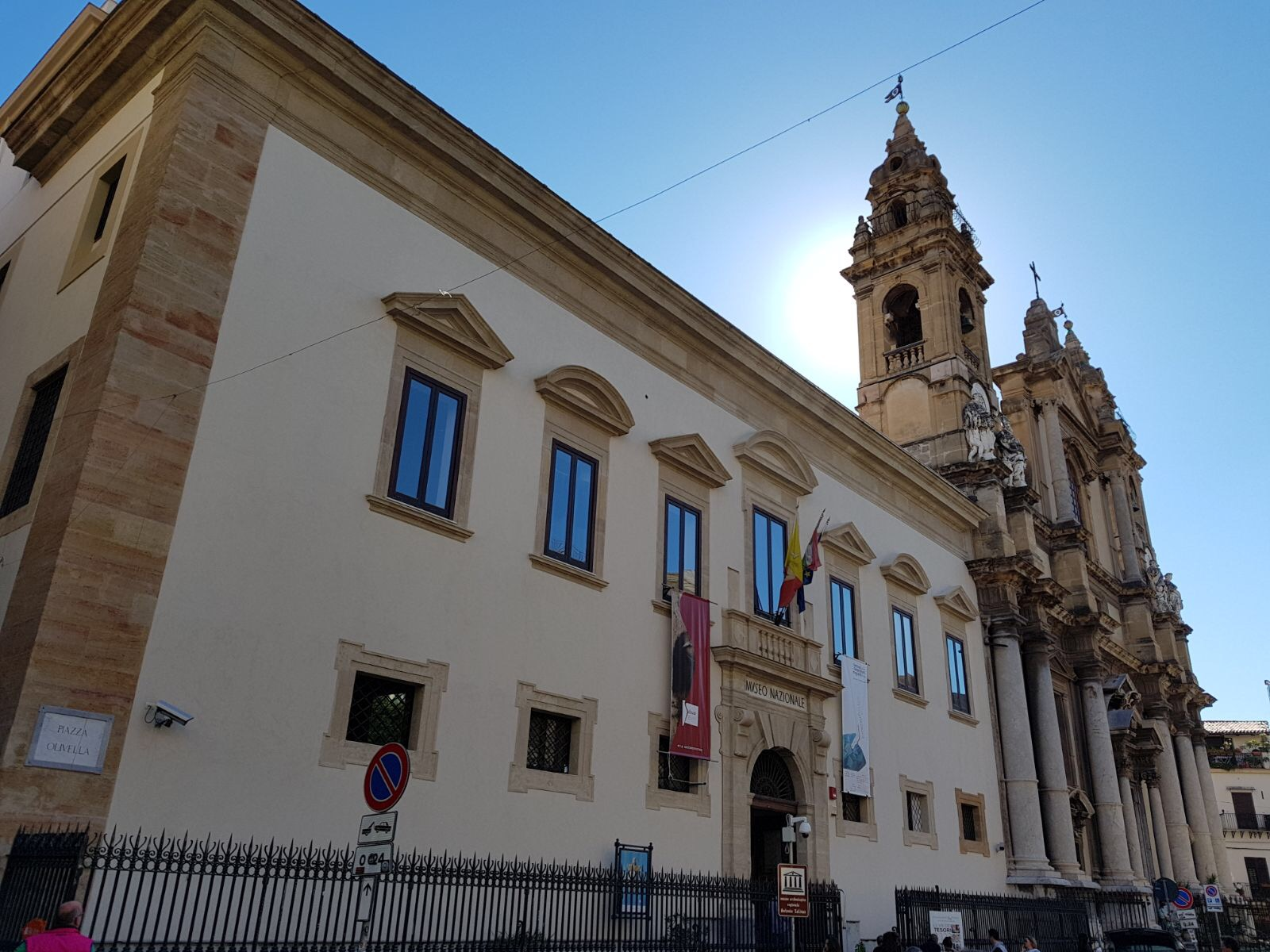
The museum

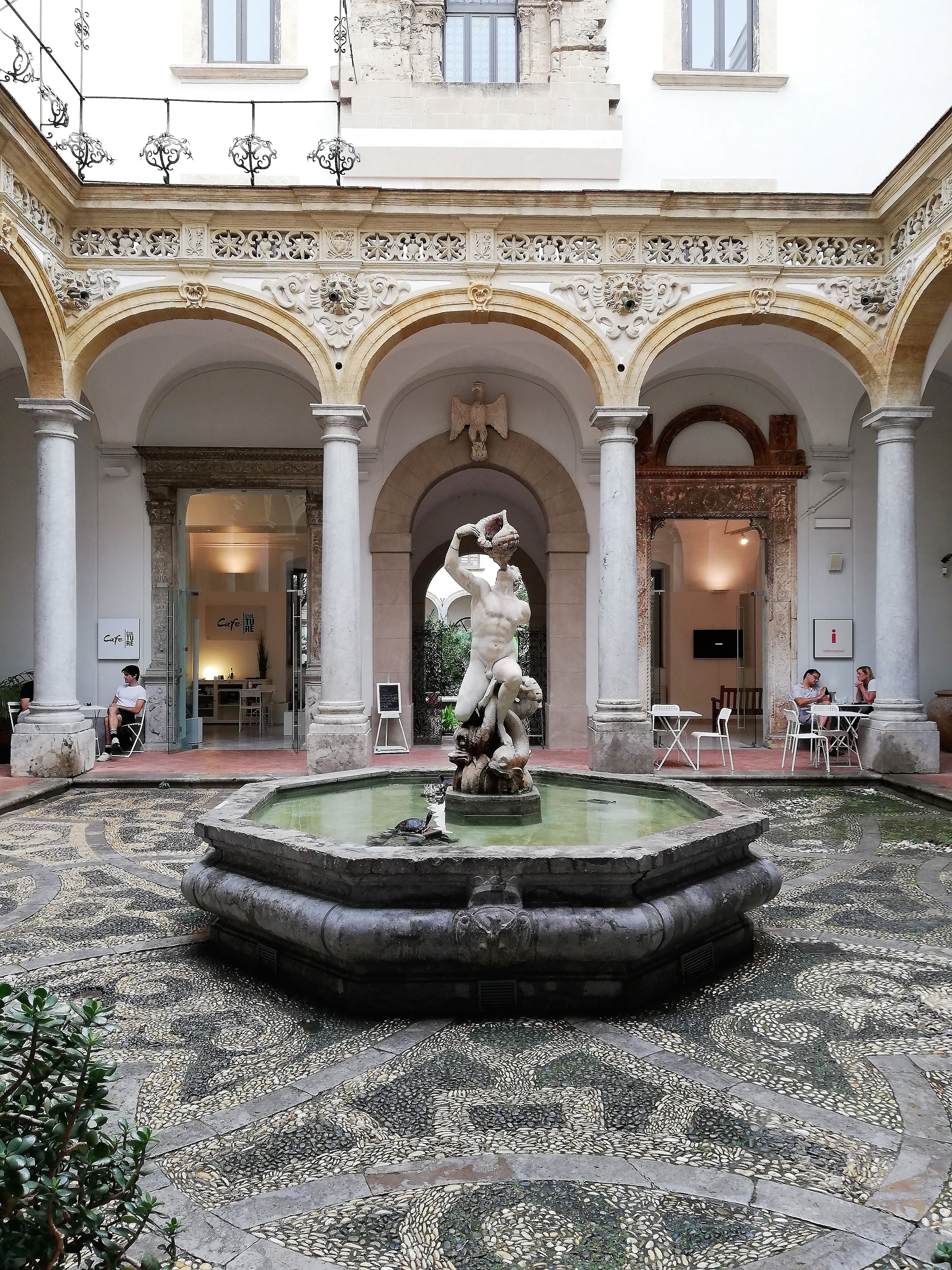
Inner courtyard

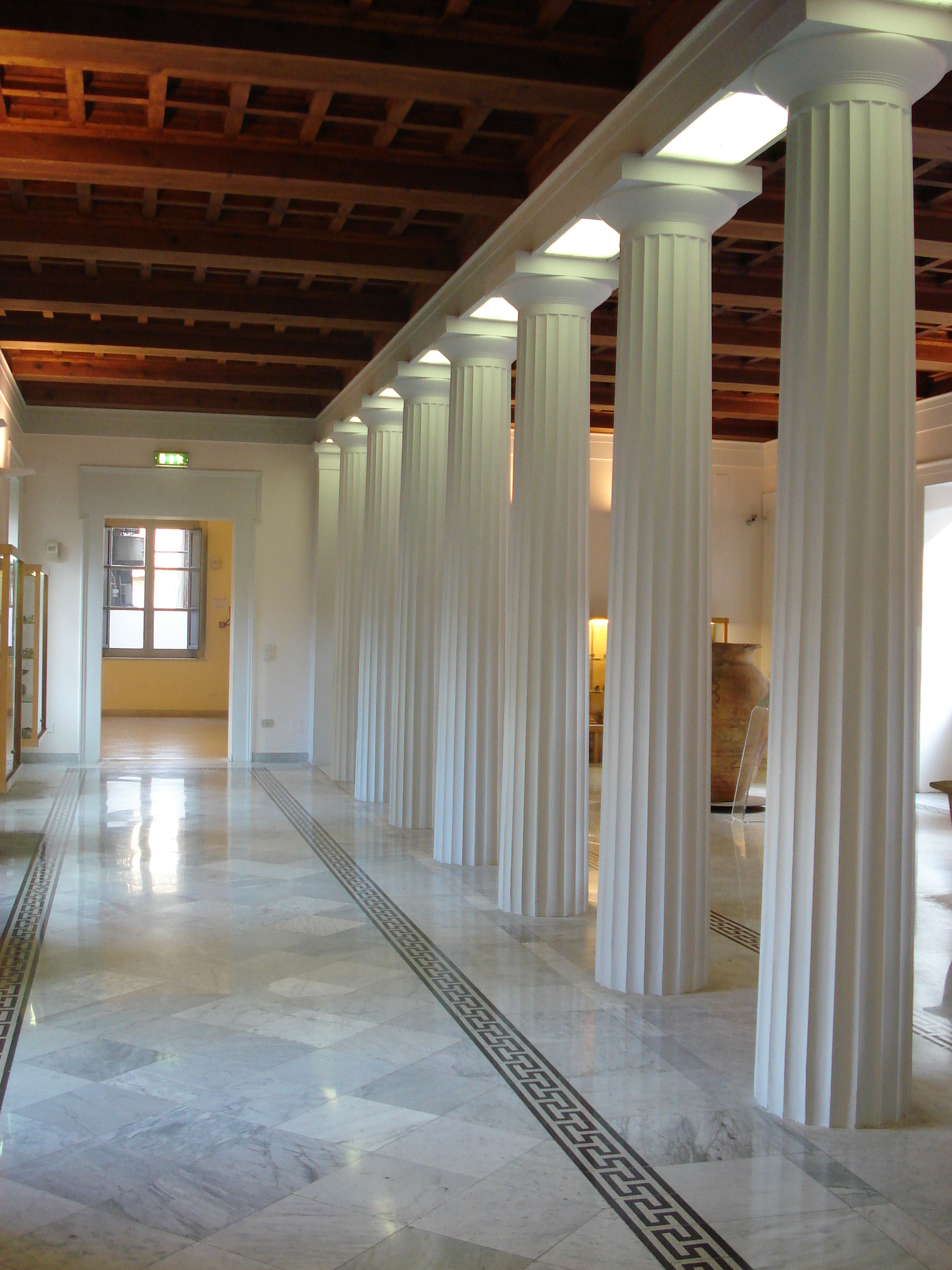
A room in the museum

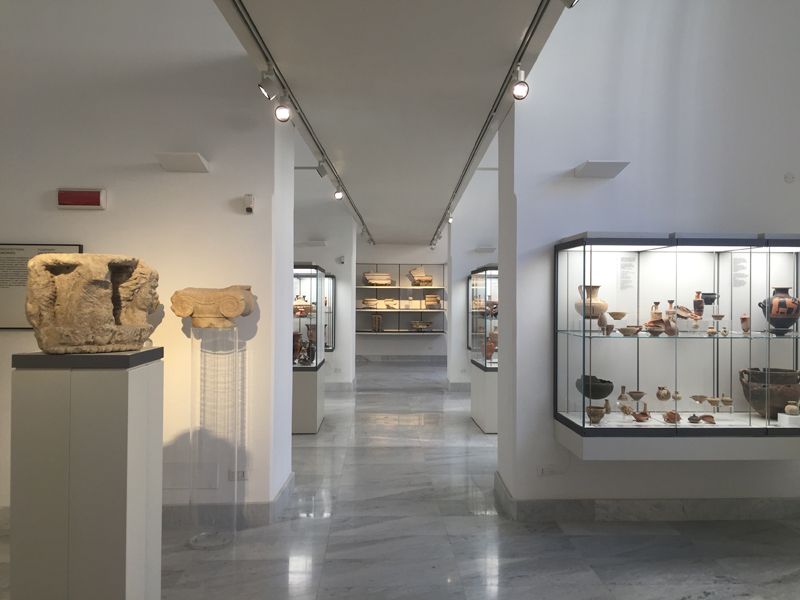
A room in the museum

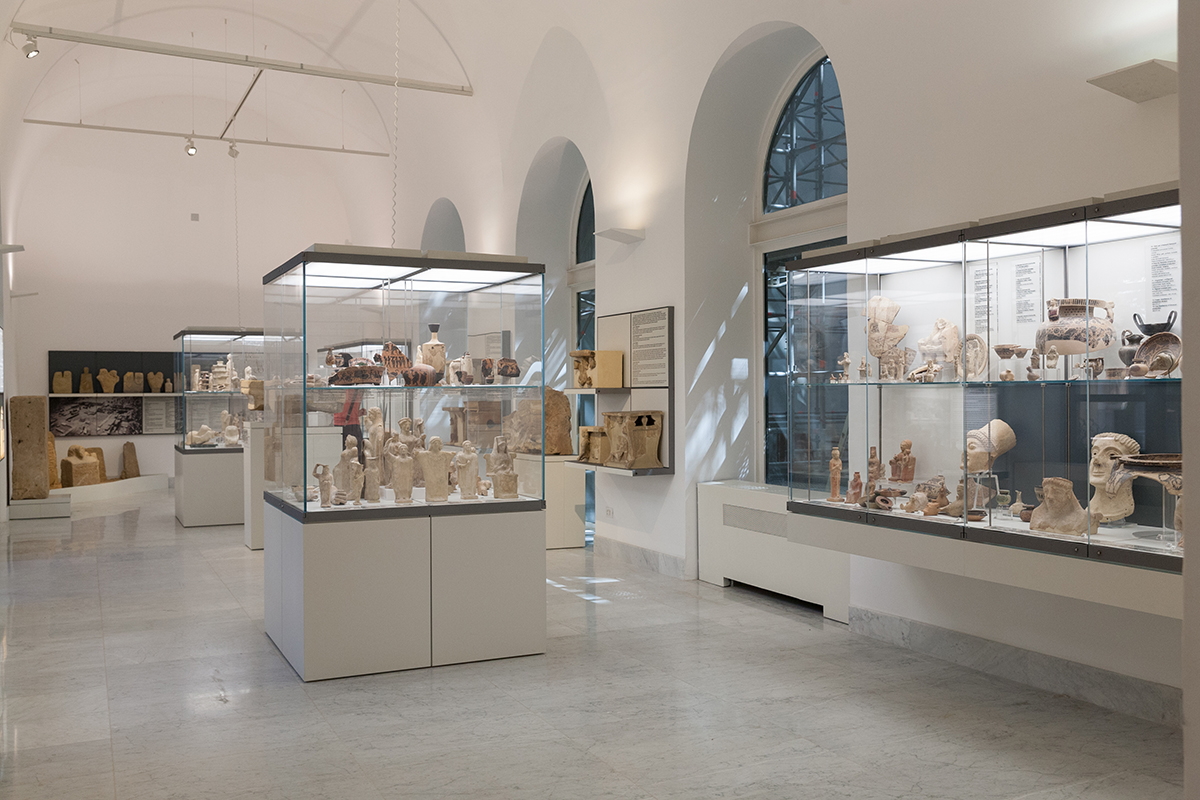
A room in the museum

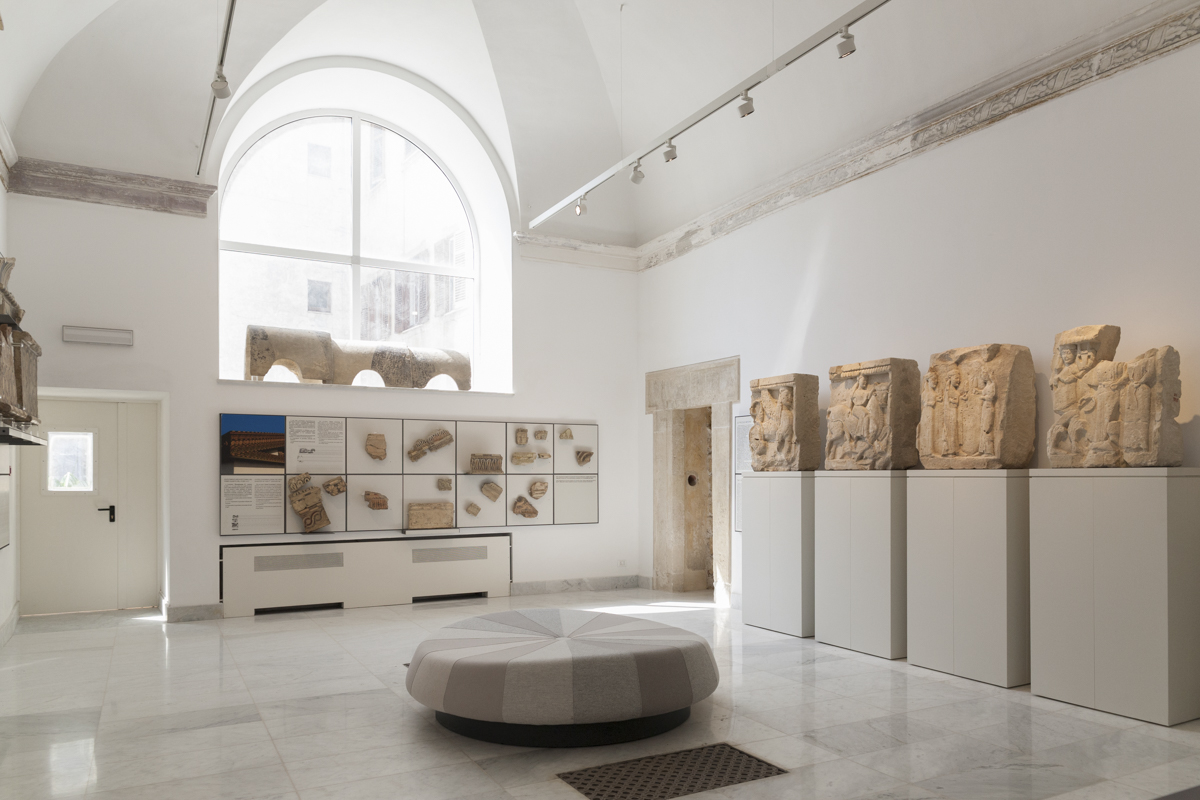
Metopes of Temple Y in Selinunte

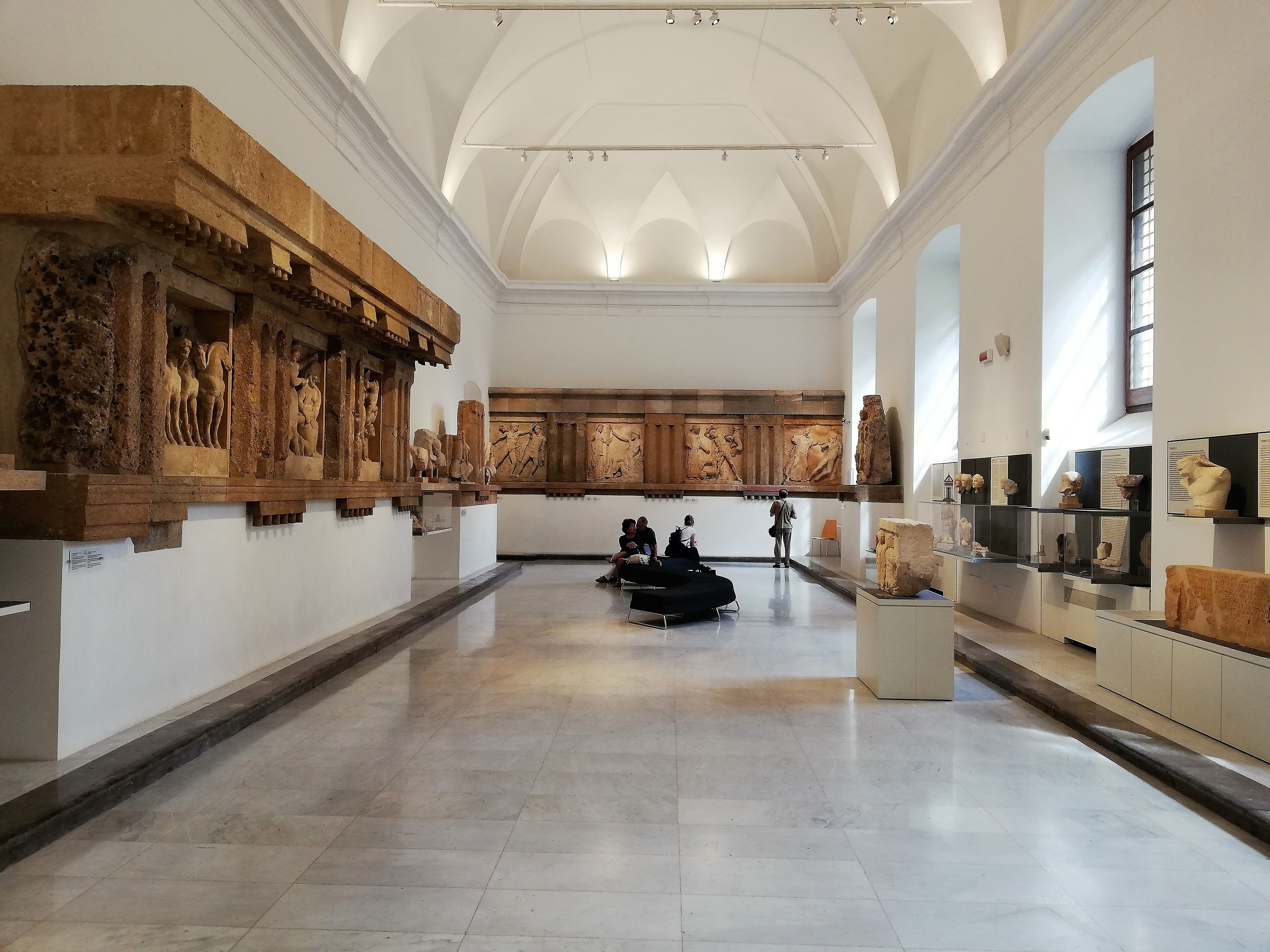
Metopes of Temple C, E and F in Selinunte

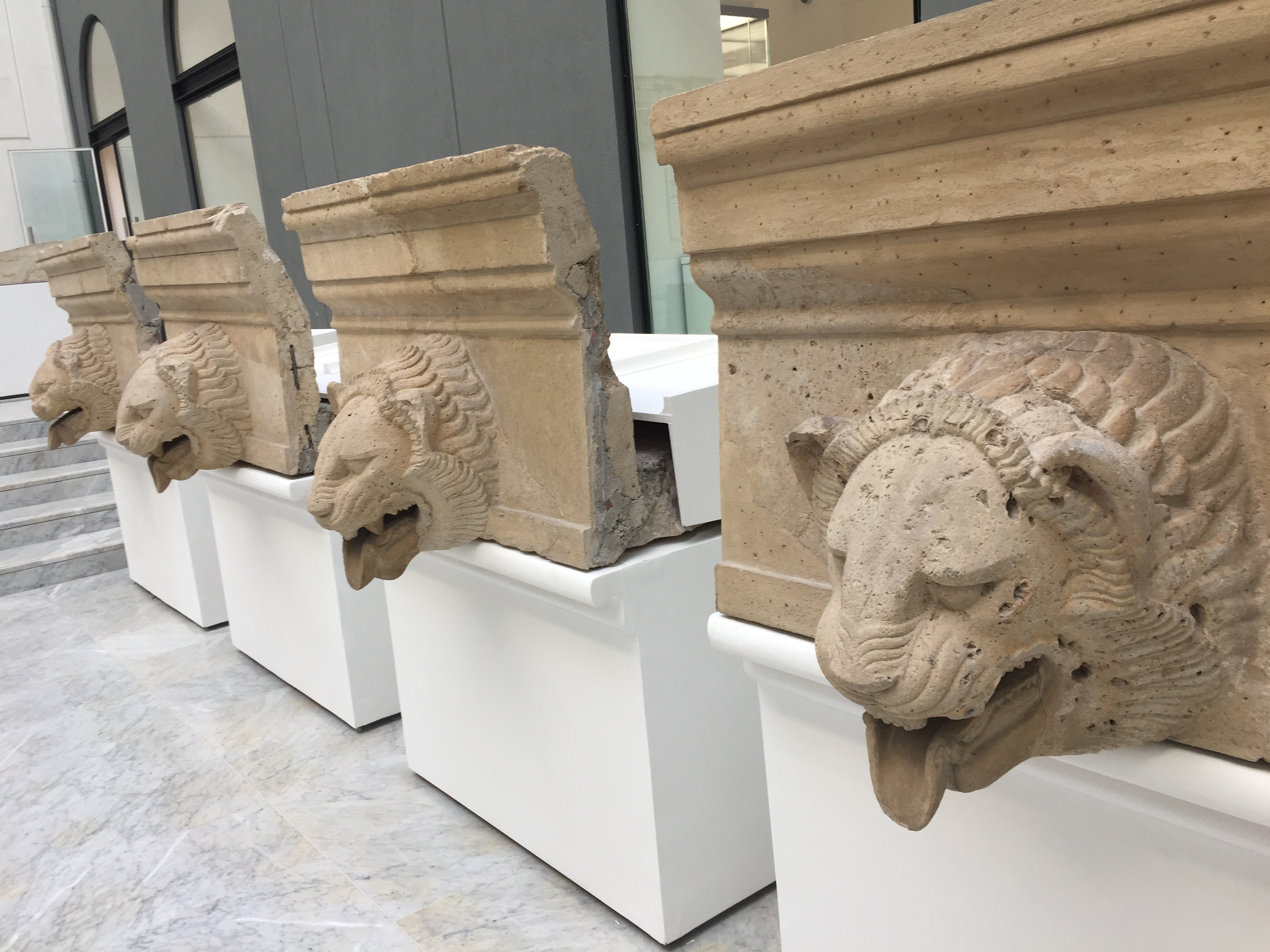
Lion heads of Temple of Victory Himera

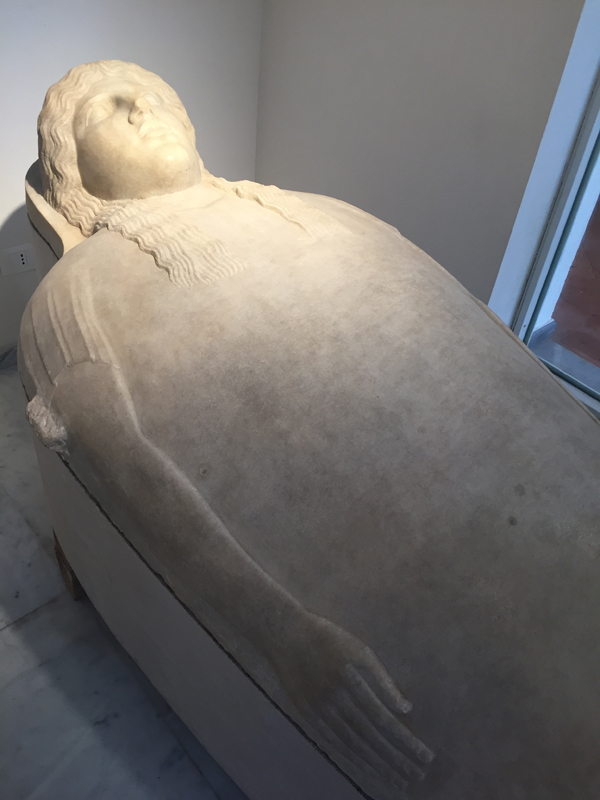
Phoenician sarcophagus from Pizzo Cannita, Misilmeri

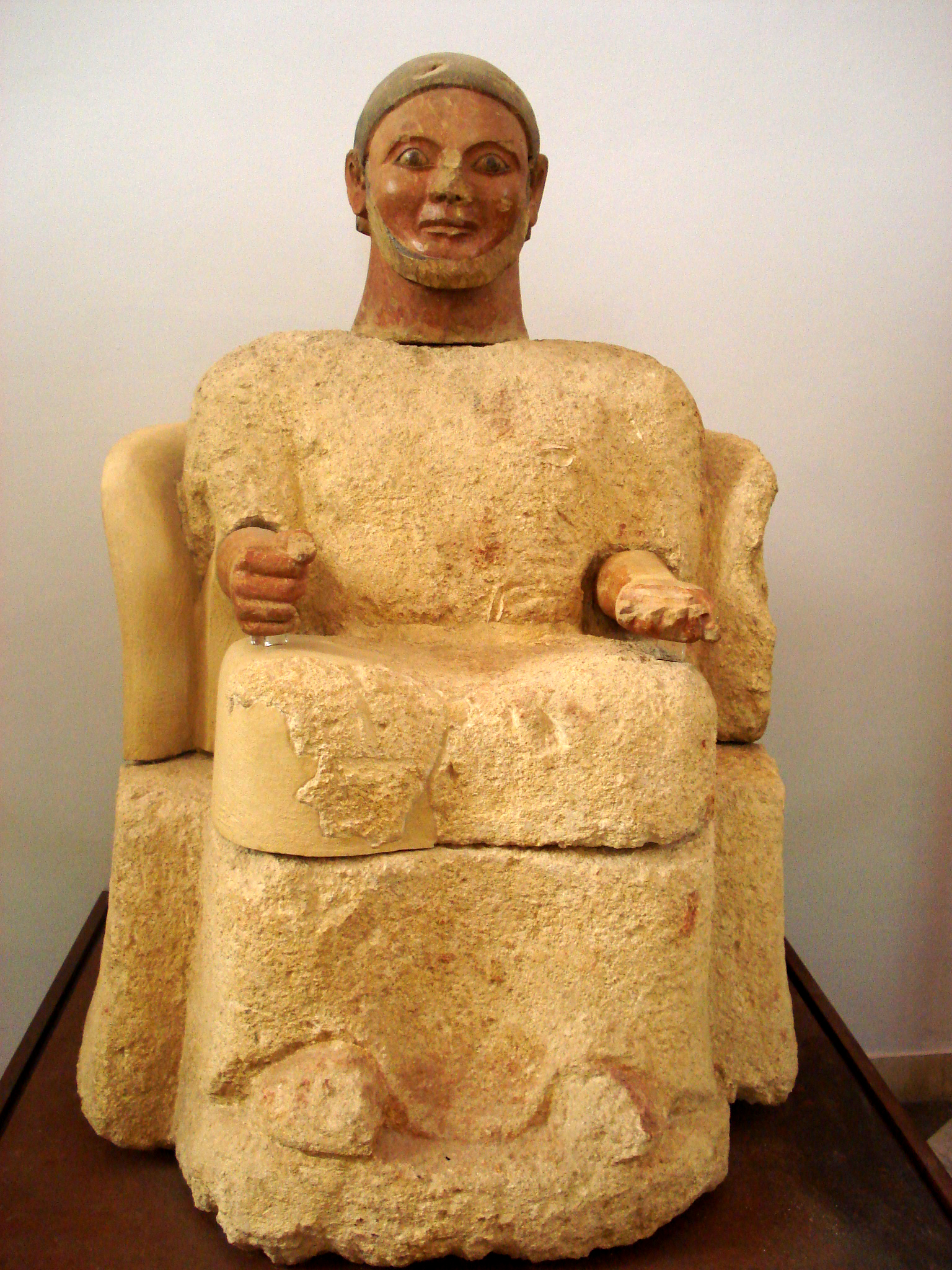
Etruscan funerary statue from Chiusi

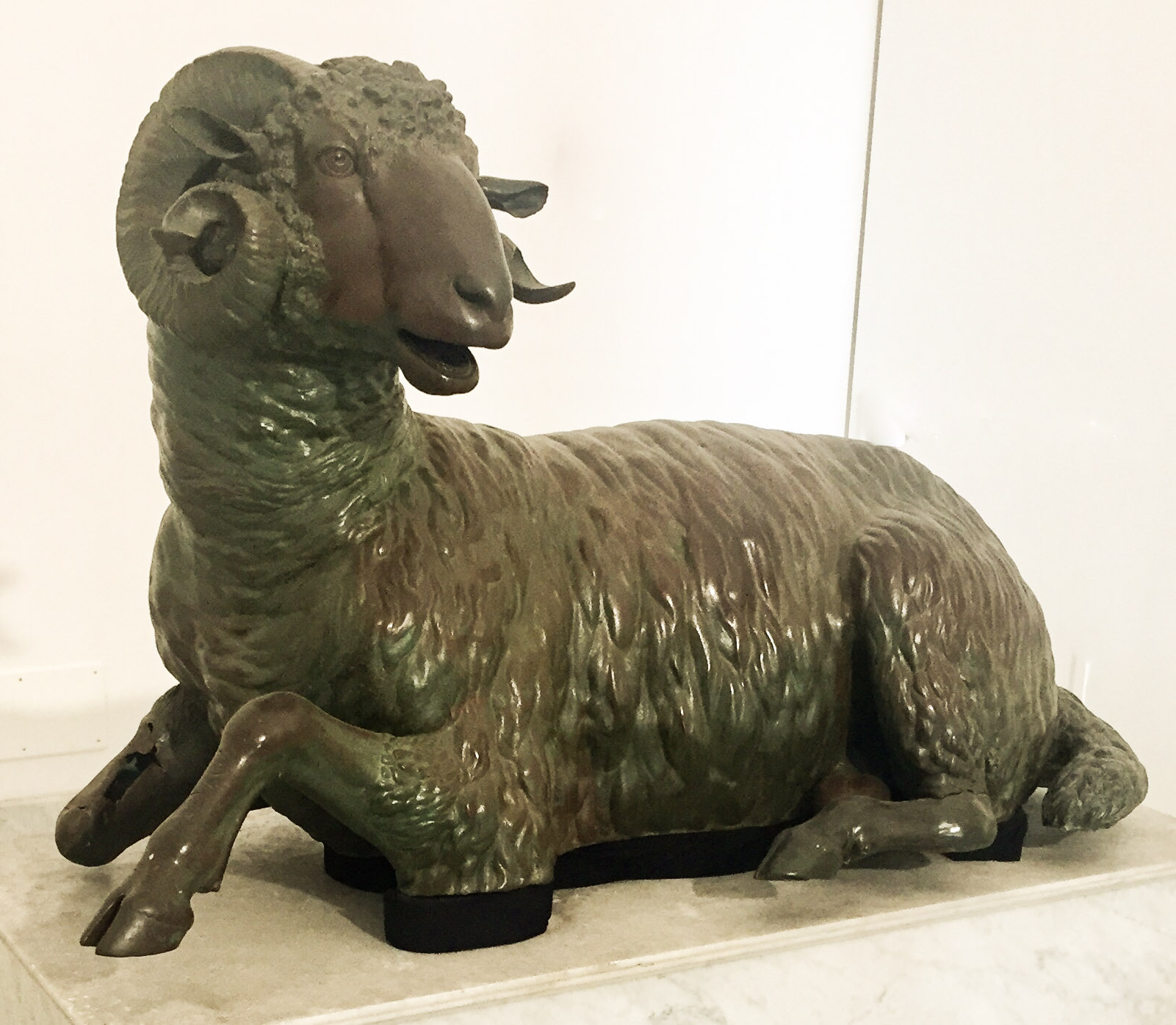
Bronze ram statue from Syracuse

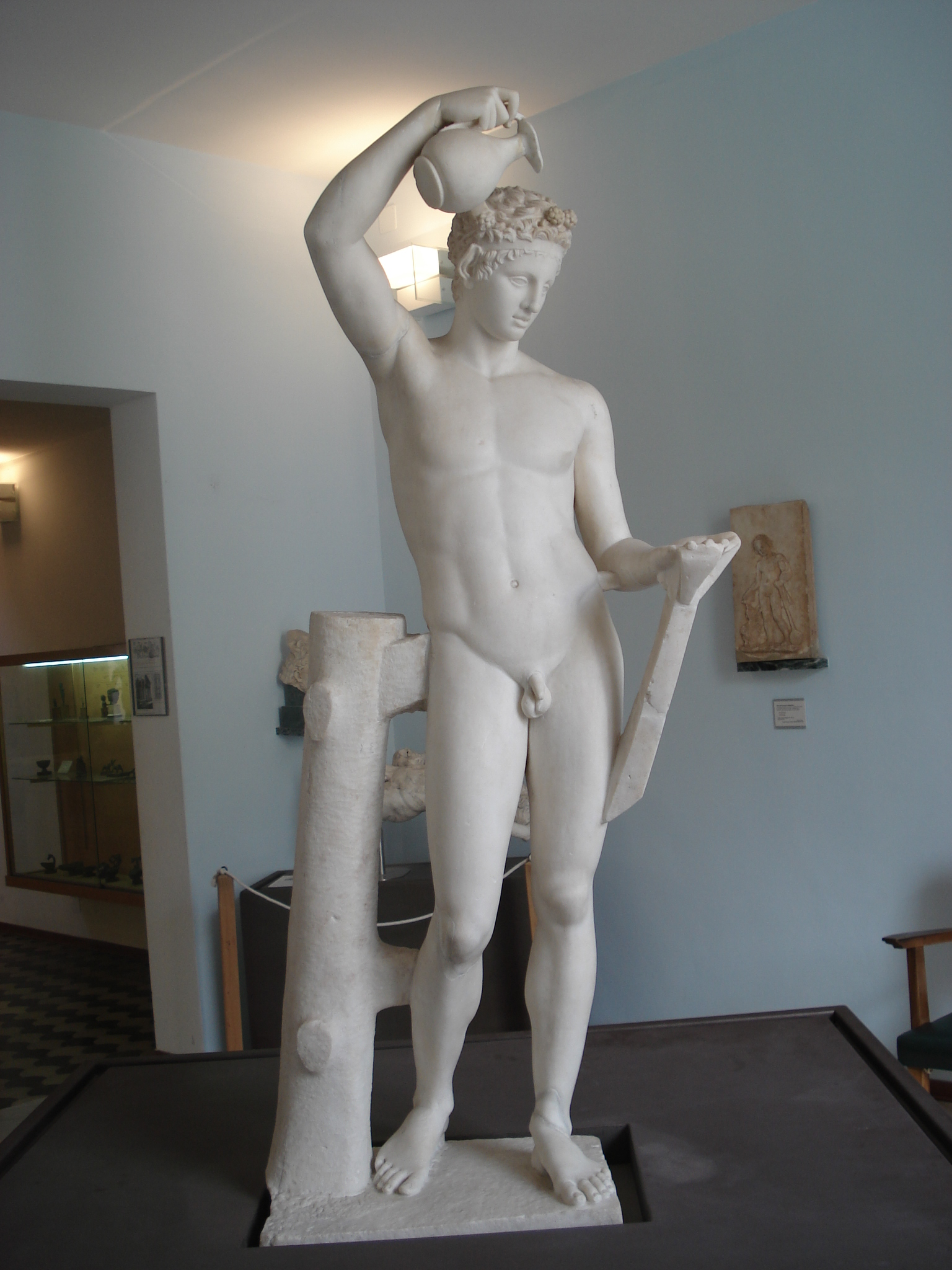
Satyr from Torre del Greco

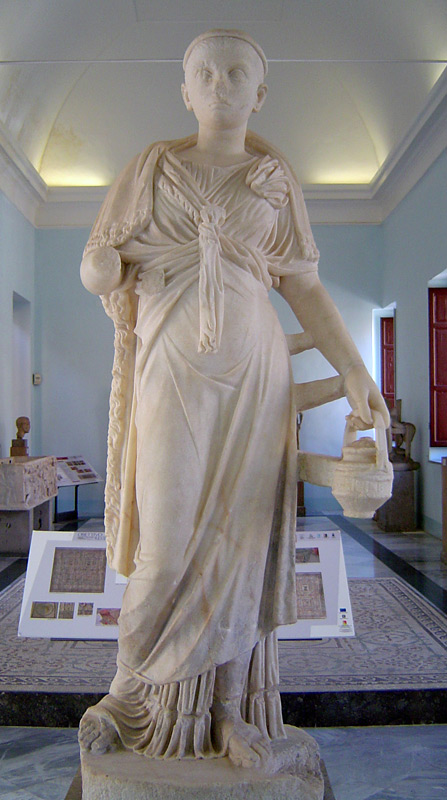
Priestess of Isis from Taormina, 2nd c. AD

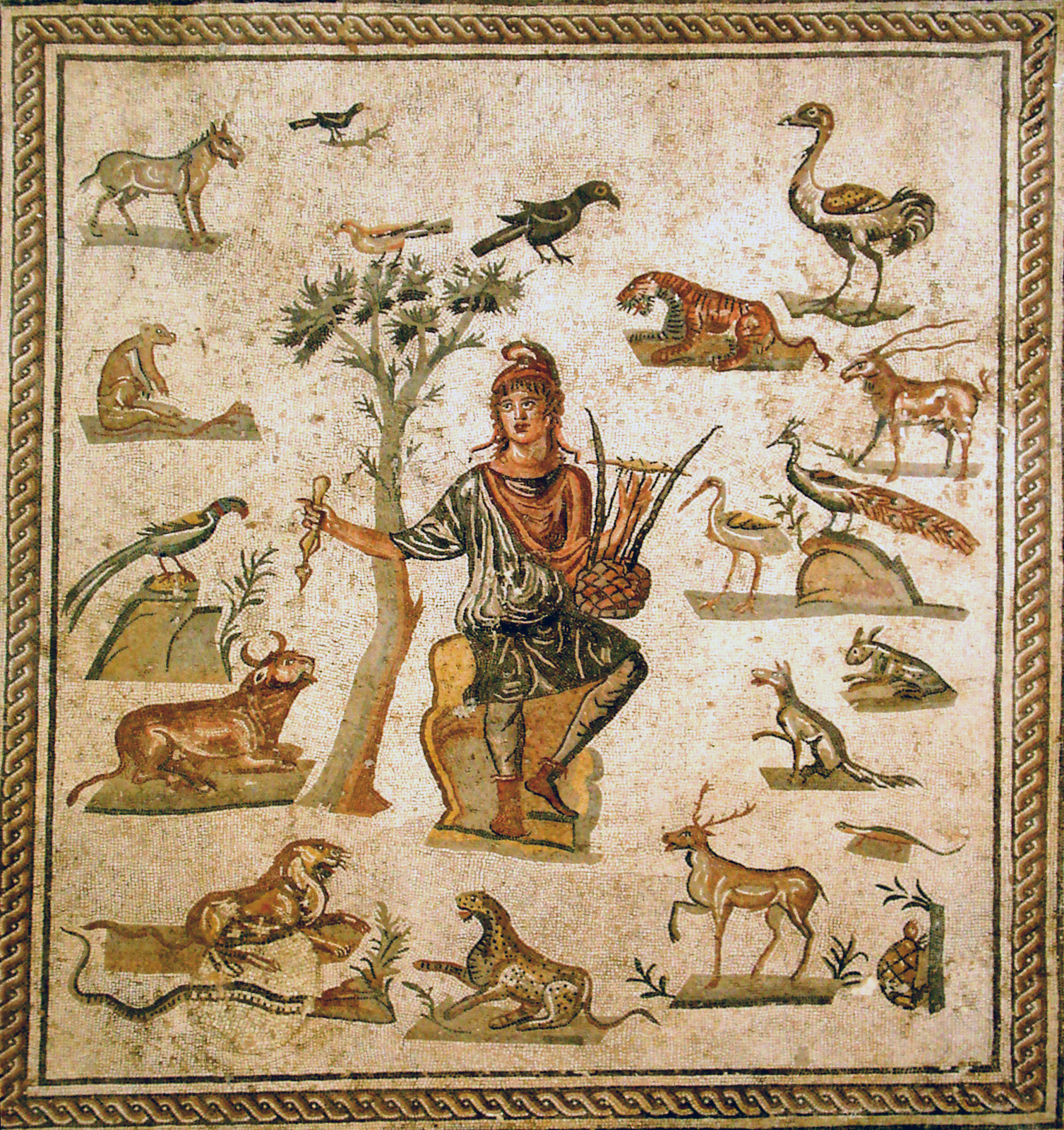
Roman mosaic from Palermo

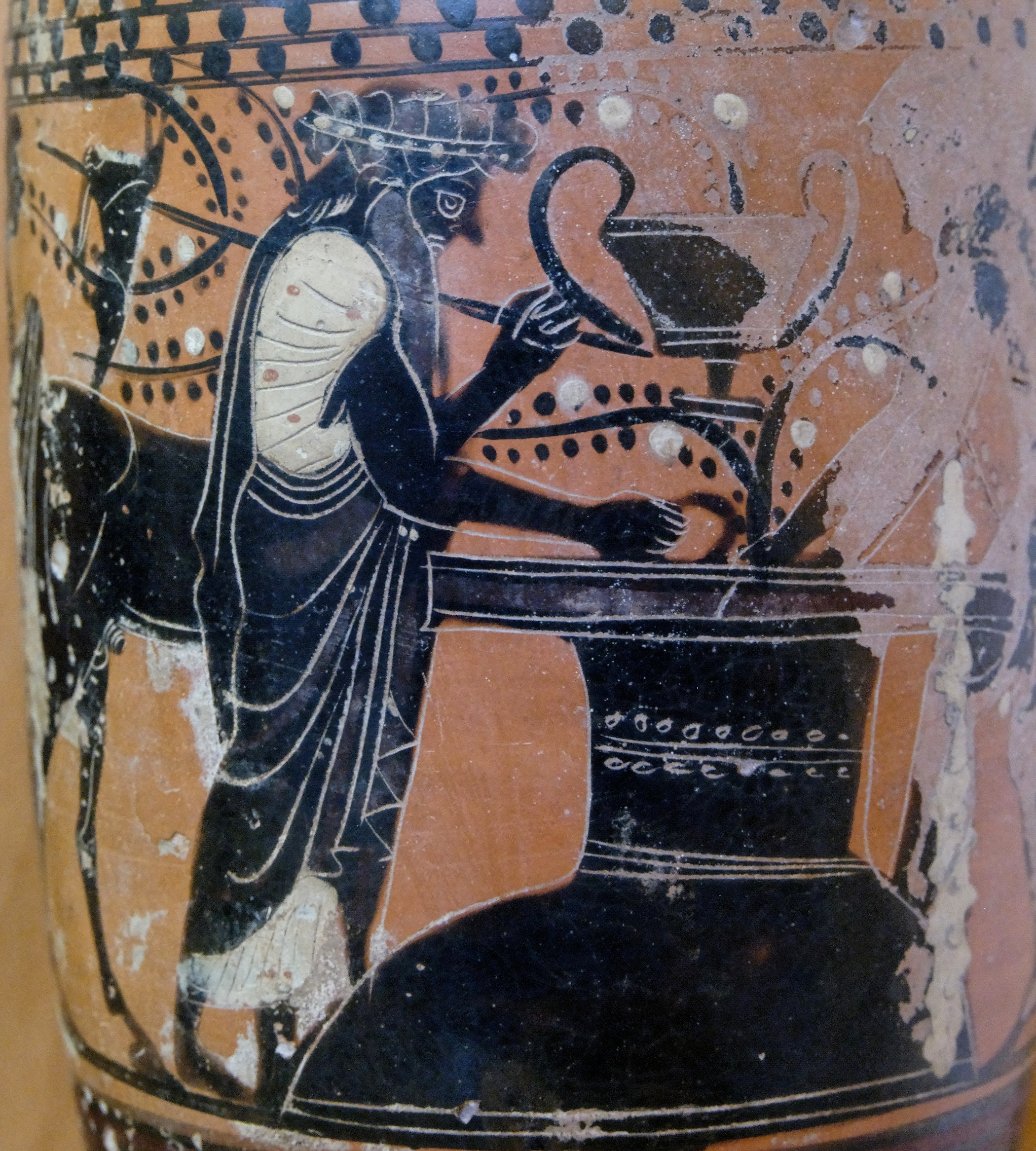
Attic black-figure lekythos

== See also ==
- Palermo Fragment
- Palermo Stone
- List of largest art museums
