= Delphi Archaeological Museum =

Coordinates: 38.4801275°N 22.4999303°E

- Αρχαιολογικό Μουσείο Δελφών
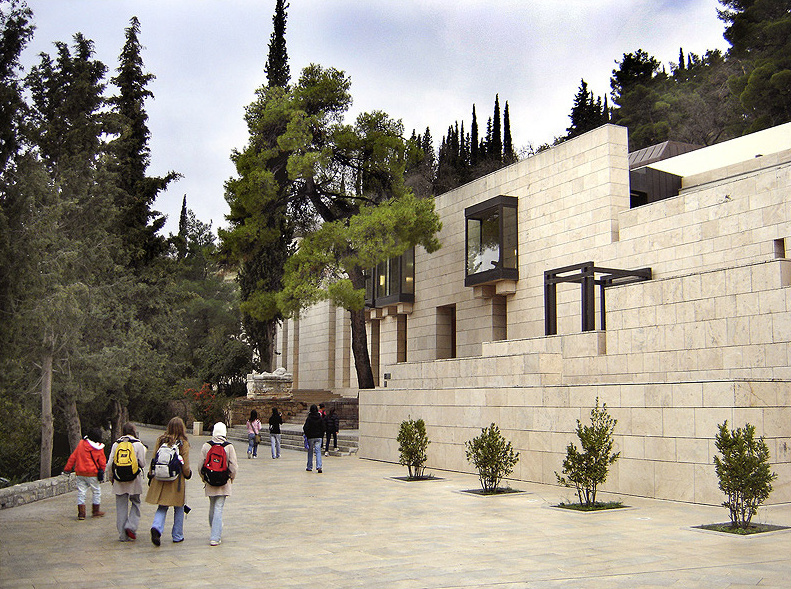
- Delphi Archaeological Museum

- Location within Greece
- Established: 1903
- Location: Τ.Κ. 33054, Delphi, Greece
- Type: Archaeological museum
- Collections: Greek antiquities
- Visitors: 137,550 (2009)
- Owners: Greek Ministry of Culture (10th ephorate of prehistoric and classical antiquities
- Website: "Outline on the website of the Greek Ministry of Culture".

Delphi Archaeological museum (Greek: Αρχαιολογικό Μουσείο Δελφών) is one of the principal museums of Greece and one of the most visited. It is operated by the Greek Ministry of Culture (Ephorate of Antiquities of Phocis). Founded in 1903, it has been rearranged several times and houses the discoveries made at the Panhellenic sanctuary of Delphi, which date from the Late Helladic (Mycenean) period to the early Byzantine era.

Organised in fourteen rooms on two levels, the museum mainly displays statues, including the famous Charioteer of Delphi, architectural elements, like the frieze of the Siphnian Treasury and ex votos dedicated to the sanctuary of Pythian Apollo, like the Sphinx of Naxos. The exhibition floor space is more than 2270 m^{2}, while the storage and conservation rooms (mosaics, ceramics and metals) take up 558 m^{2}. Visitors are also catered to by an entrance hall, a cafeteria and a gift shop.

== History of the museum ==
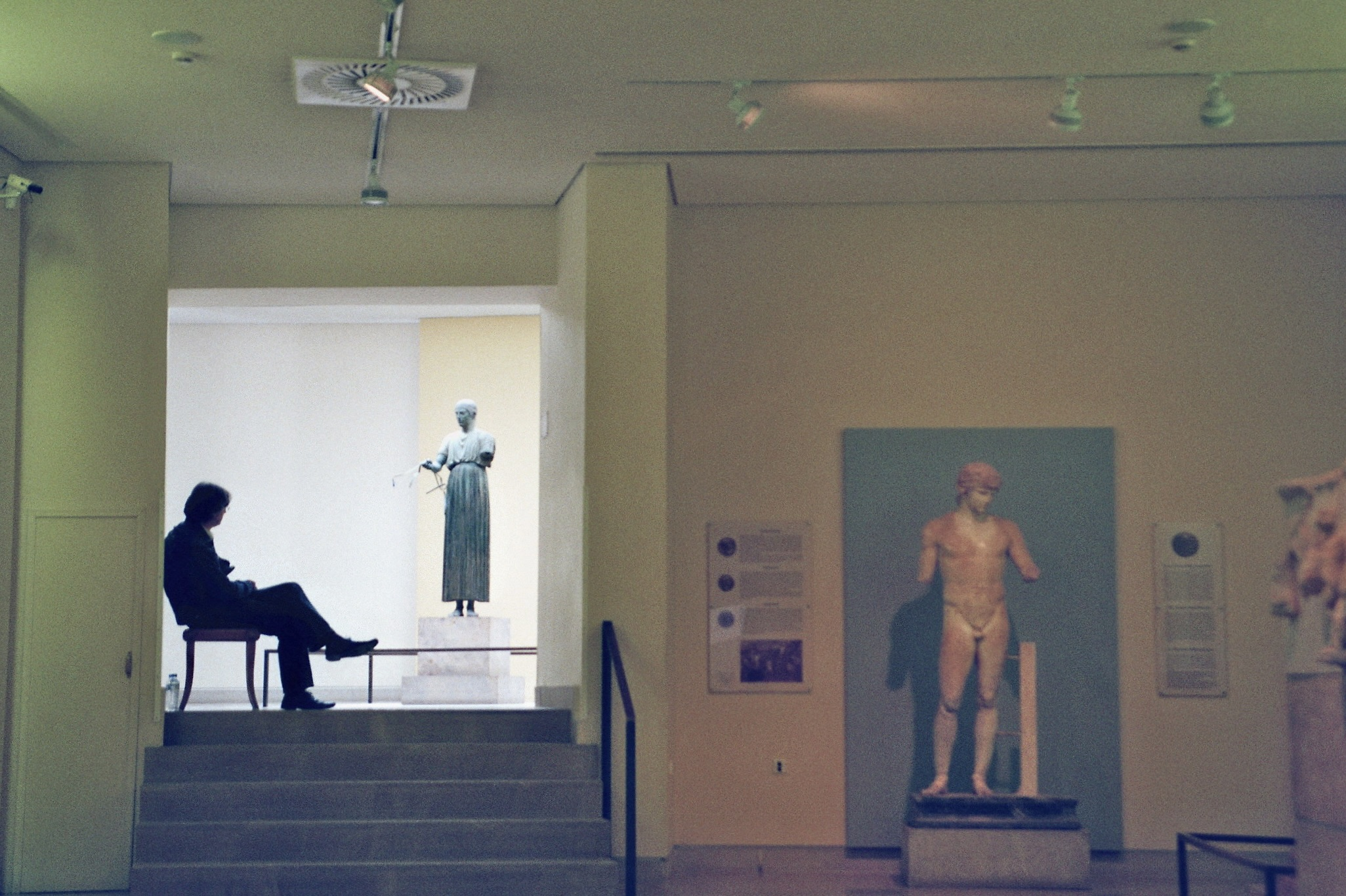
Interior of the museum

=== First museum ===
A first, rather small museum was inaugurated on 2 May 1903 to celebrate the end of the first great archaeological campaign of French excavations and to exhibit the findings. The building was designed by the French architect Albert Tournaire, financed by a trust established by the Greek banker and philanthropist Andreas Syngros. Two wings framed a small central building. The arrangement of the collection, designed by the director of the archaeological expedition, Théophile Homolle, was inspired by the view that the architectural parts and sculptures should be put "in context". Thus, parts of the main monuments of the site were reconstructed with plaster. Yet, the exhibits took every inch of available space, making the exhibition look pretty crammed. Furthermore, the museographic approach lacked any chronological or thematic arrangement. The quality of the exhibits themselves was thought to be self-explanatory. The first exhibition was thus destined more to the pleasure of the eyes than to any educational purpose.

=== Subsequent phases ===
Despite the admiration it inspired to the Greek and international community, already in the 1930s the museum was becoming too small to accommodate new findings or the increasing number of tourists. In addition, its arrangement (or, rather, the absence of it) and the plaster restorations were being increasingly criticized. Finally, its entire appearance was criticized as a little too "French" in a period which insisted on "Greekness." The construction of a new building was launched in 1935. The new museum was representative of the architectural trends of the Interwar period and was accomplished in 1939, including a new arrangement of the objects by the Professor of Archaeology at Thessaloniki, Constantinos Romaios. The reorganisation of the Archaic collections was entrusted to the French archaeologist Pierre de La Coste-Messelière, who discarded the plaster restorations of significant artefacts, including that of the Siphnian Treasury, which had become one of the principal attractions. The antiquities were presented in a chronological order, listed and labelled.

However, this arrangement was only briefly in use. The outbreak of World War II constituted a major threat to the antiquities which were put into storage. Part was kept at Delphi in the ancient Roman tombs or in specially dug pits in front of the museum. The most precious objects (the chryselephantine objects, the silver Statue of a Bull discovered three months before the outbreak of war, and the Charioteer were sent to Athens in order to be stored in the vaults of the Bank of Greece. They remained there for ten years. The charioteer was on display in the National Archaeological Museum of Athens until 1951. The region of Delphi was at the heart of the combat zone in the Greek Civil War and the museum was not reopened until 1952. For six years, visitors could view the arrangement that had been envisioned in 1939. However, the museum proved insufficient and it was necessary to undertake a new phase of construction, completed in 1958.

The renovation of the museum was entrusted to the architect Patroklos Karantinos and the archaeologist Christos Karouzos was sent from the National Archaeological Museum of Athens to rearrange the collection, under the supervision of the ephor of Delphi, Ioanna Constantinou. Karantinos created two new exhibition halls and modified the structure to allow more natural light into the building. The arrangement of the collection remained chronological, but a greater focus was placed on the sculpture, with statues increasingly separated from their architectural contexts. The museum reopened its doors in 1961. and soon became one of the most visited tourist attractions in Greece: in 1998, it received more than 300,200 visitors, almost as many as the National Archaeological Museum of Athens in the same period (325,000 visitors).

=== Current Museum ===
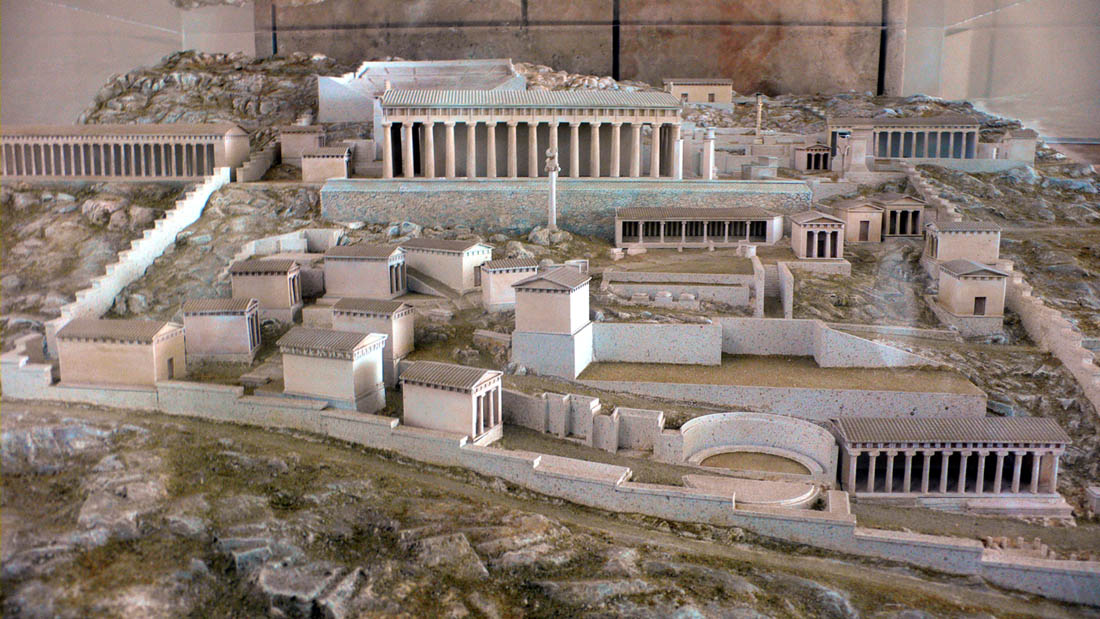
Reconstruction of the Sanctuary of Apollo, Delphi.

Between 1999 and 2003, the museum underwent yet another phase of renovations, carried out by the Greek architect Alexandros Tombazis. These included the construction of a new facade in a contemporary style and a new hall for the charioteer. The rest of the museum was redesigned in a modern style and adjusted to facilitate the circulation of visitors. A new lobby, a large cafeteria and a gift shop were also created. The collection was rearranged in order to reconcile the need to display the main attractions of the museum effectively and the wish to present the latest theories and discoveries of archaeological and historical scholarships. An effort was also made to illustrate hitherto neglected exhibits like the classical facade of the Temple of Apollo. The museum opened its doors once more for its centenary.

== Collections ==
The collections of the Delphi Archaeological Museum are arranged chronologically in fourteen rooms.

=== Rooms 1 and 2 ===
The first two rooms are devoted to the most ancient objects. The exhibition starts with Mycenaean finds, particularly clay figurines, among which a significant female figure seated on a three-legged chair, which has been viewed as a precursor of the later tripods. The majority of the exhibits, however, are bronze votive offerings, dating to the 8th and 7th centuries BCE, including bronze tripods and cauldrons with decorative elements inspired by mythical creatures, such as griffins, as well as bronze figurines of warriors. The items displayed date to the late Geometric and early Archaic periods.

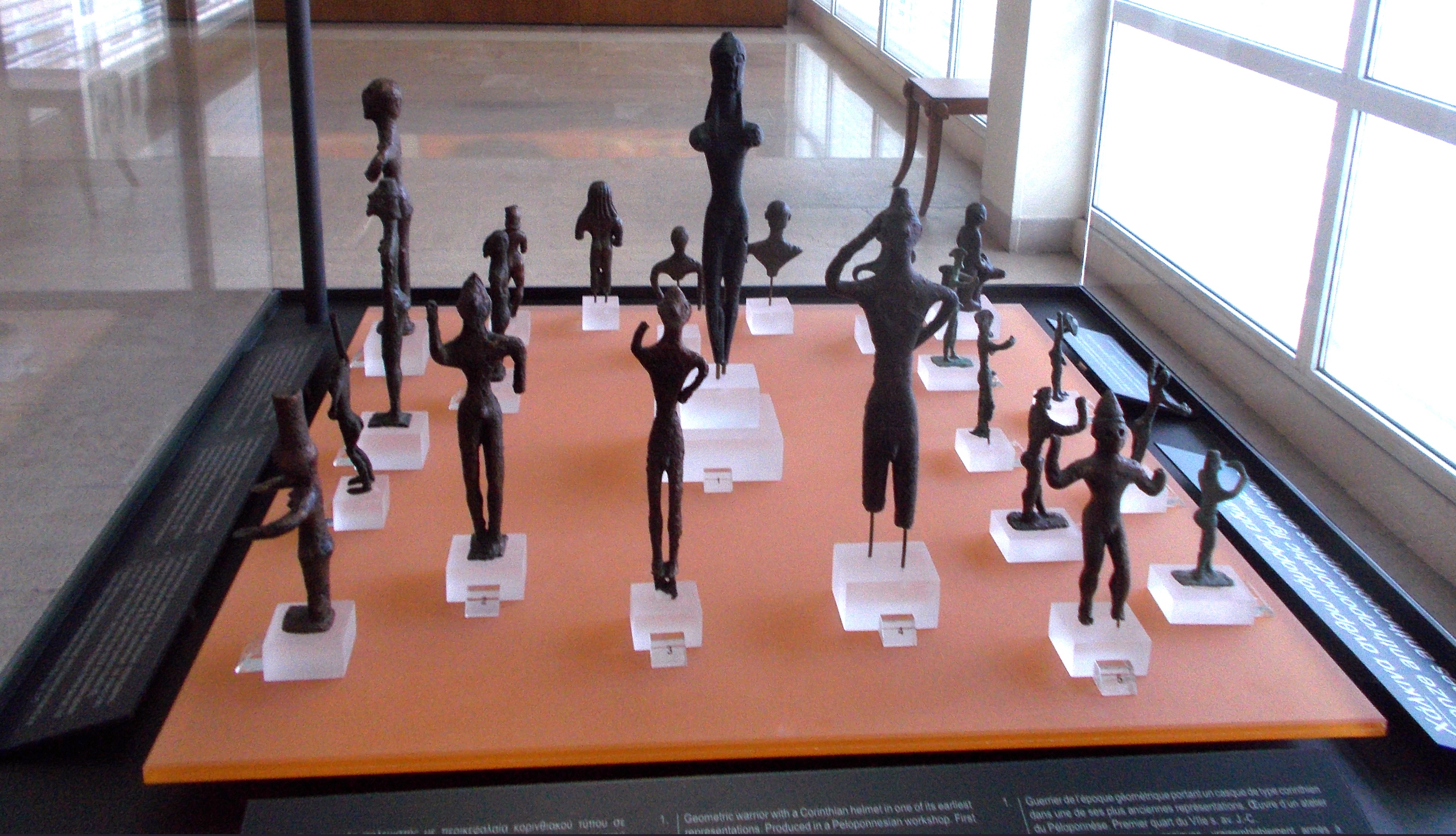
Bronze figurines, mostly warriors

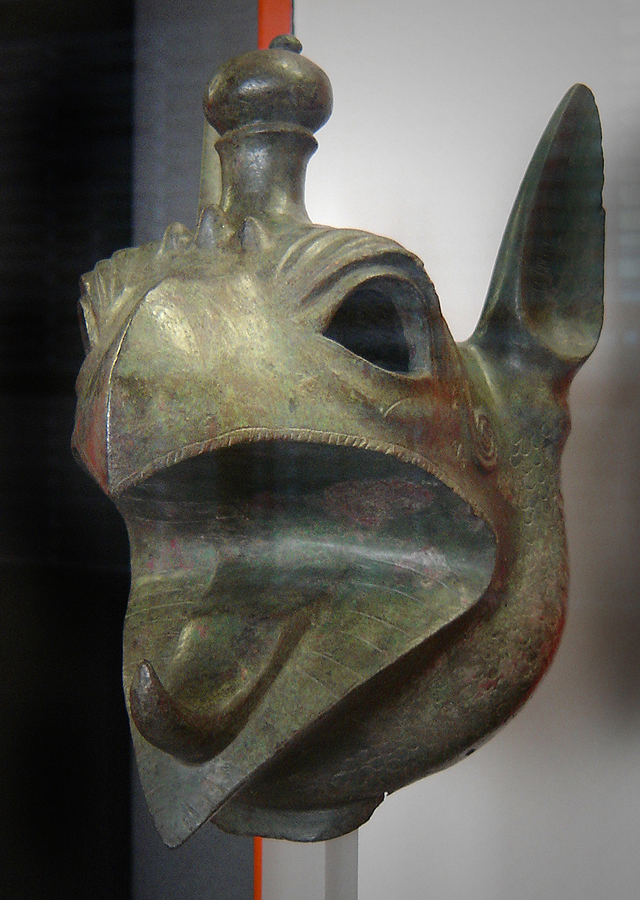
Head of a Griffon (bronze)

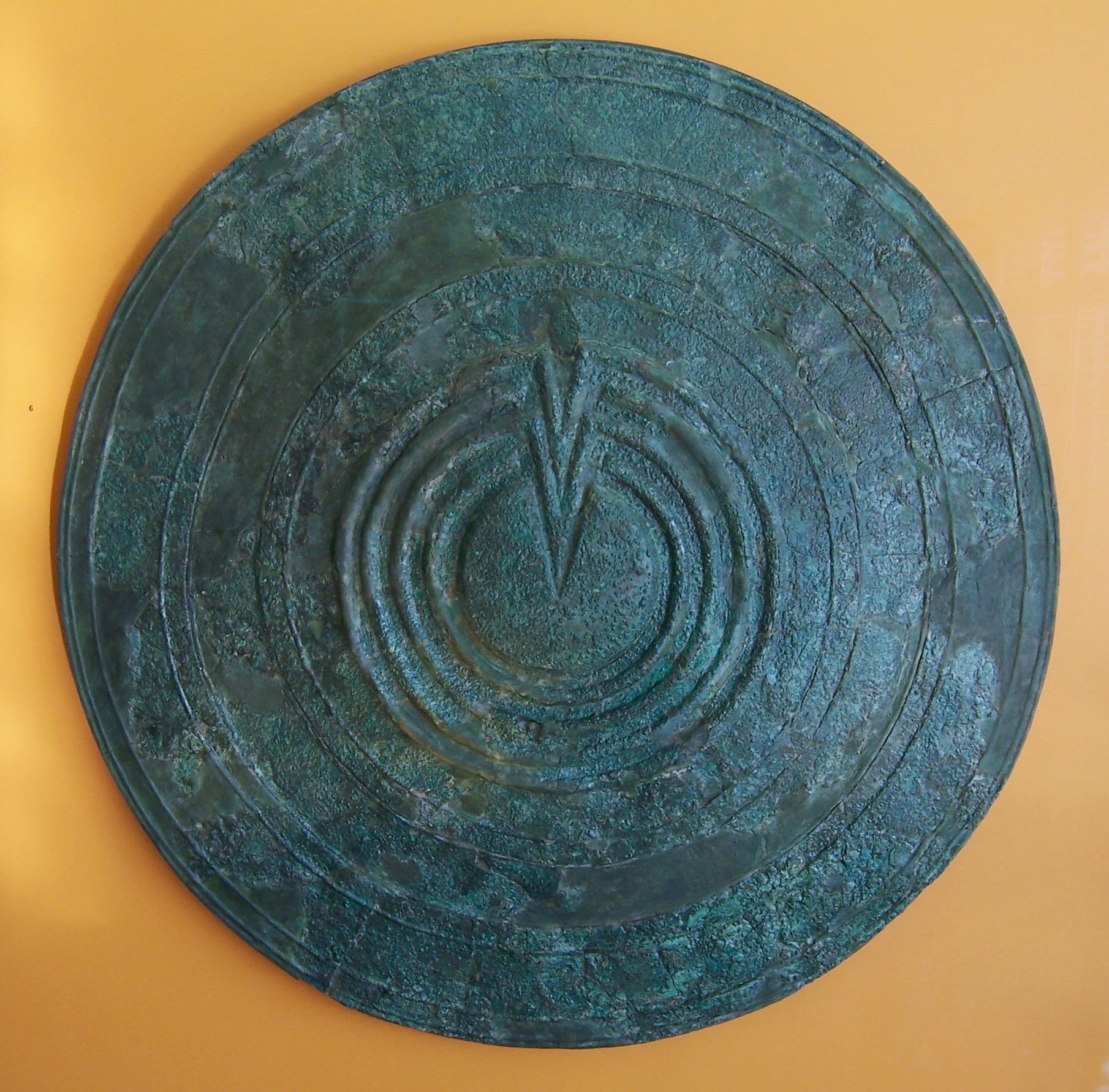
Bronze votive shield

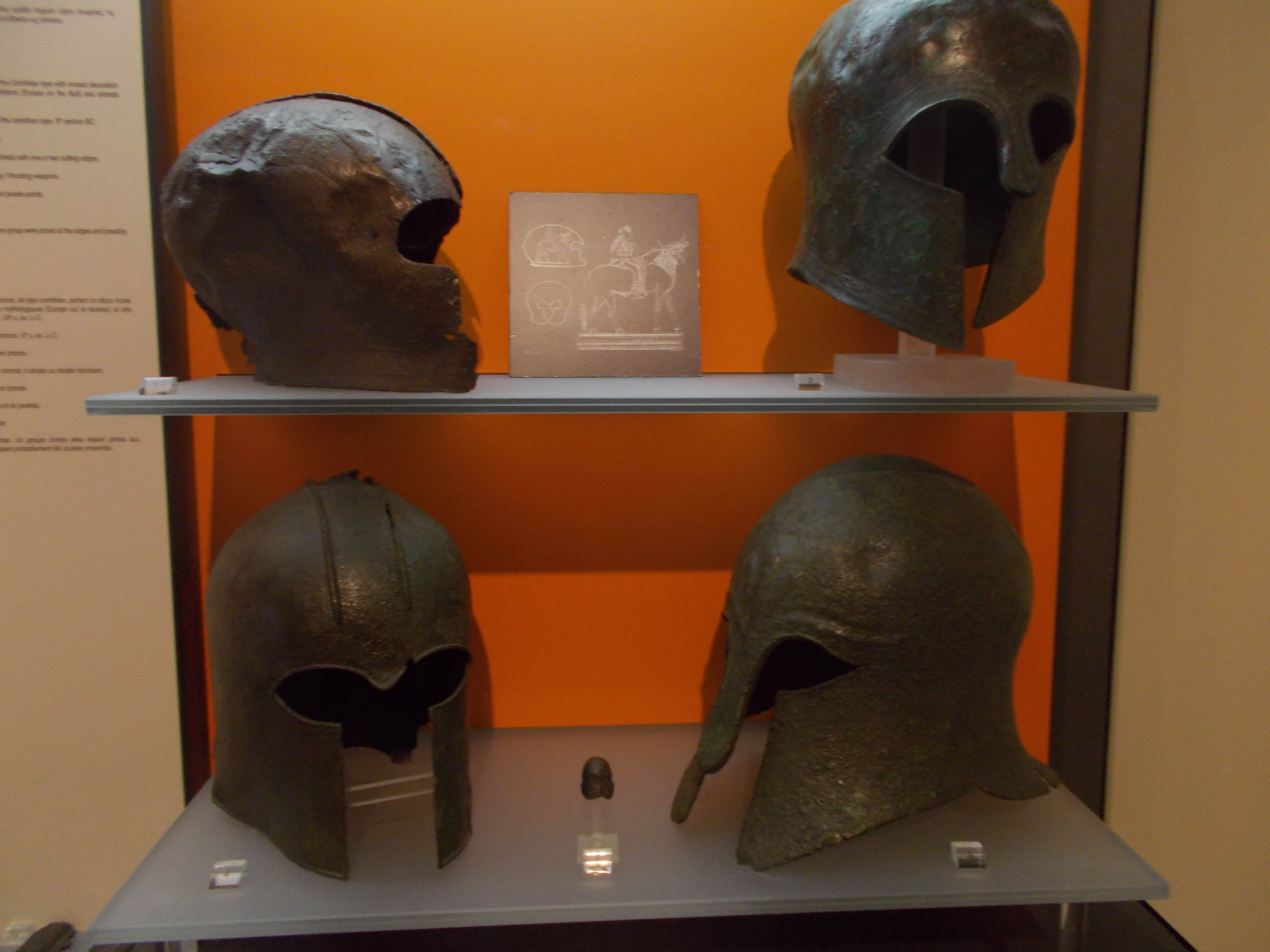
Bronze helmets

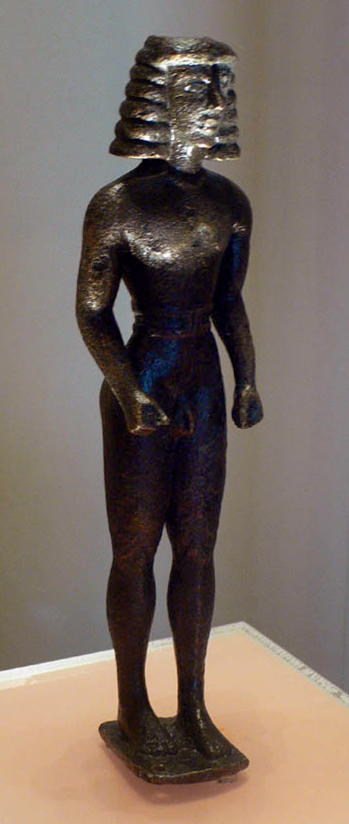
Daedelic style kouros, bronze

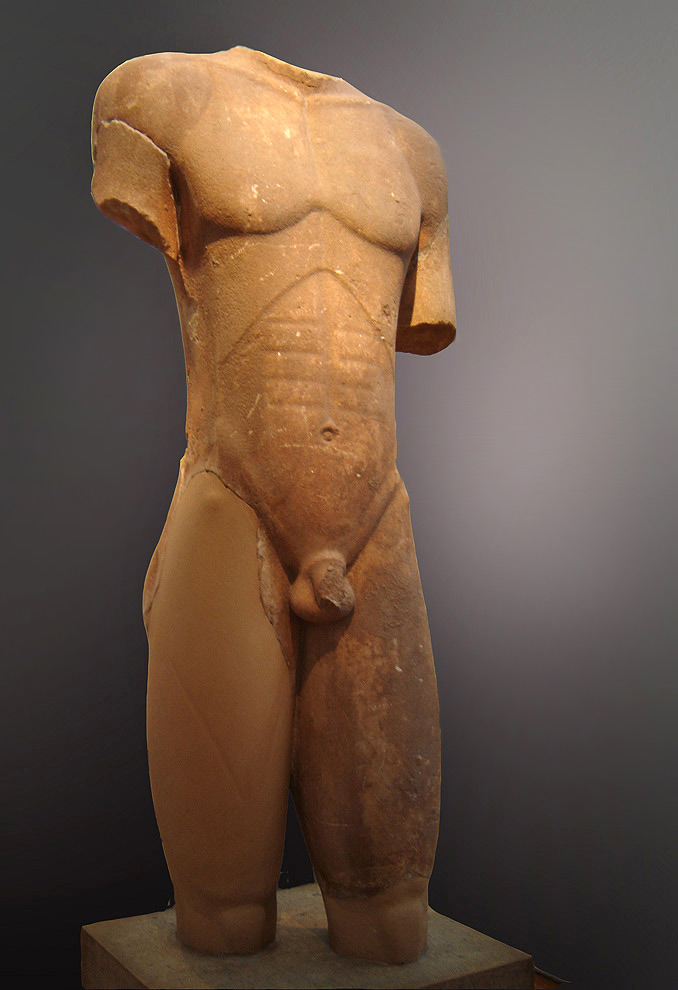
Torso of a kouros

=== Room 3 ===
Room 3 is dominated by the Kouroi of Delphi, archaic male statues known also as Cleobis and Biton, which were produced at Argos between 610 and 580 BCE. It also contains the metopes of the Treasury of the Sicyonians. The latter include four metopes made of yellowish porous stone from Sicyon, coming from the so-called "monopteros". They depict scenes from the Argonautic expedition, a scene from the myth of the Dioskouroi abducting the oxen of Arkadias aided by their cousins, Idas and Lyngeus, some scenes from the hunt of the Calydonian boar and, finally, the scene of the abduction of Europe by Zeus transformed into a bull. Some bronze figurines of the 6th century BCE are also displayed in the same room, of which notable is a figurine of Apollo, made by a Laconian workshop. On one of the cases fastened against the wall is displayed a bronze tile depicting a scene from the Odyssey: A man, probably Odysseus, tied under the belly of a ram is possibly escaping from the cave of Polyphemus; another tile depicts Heracles carrying the Erymanthian boar to king Eurystheus, who hides in a jar, terrified. Finally, simae from two archaic treasuries are also displayed; they are made of terracotta and are decorated with rosettes and spiral motifs.

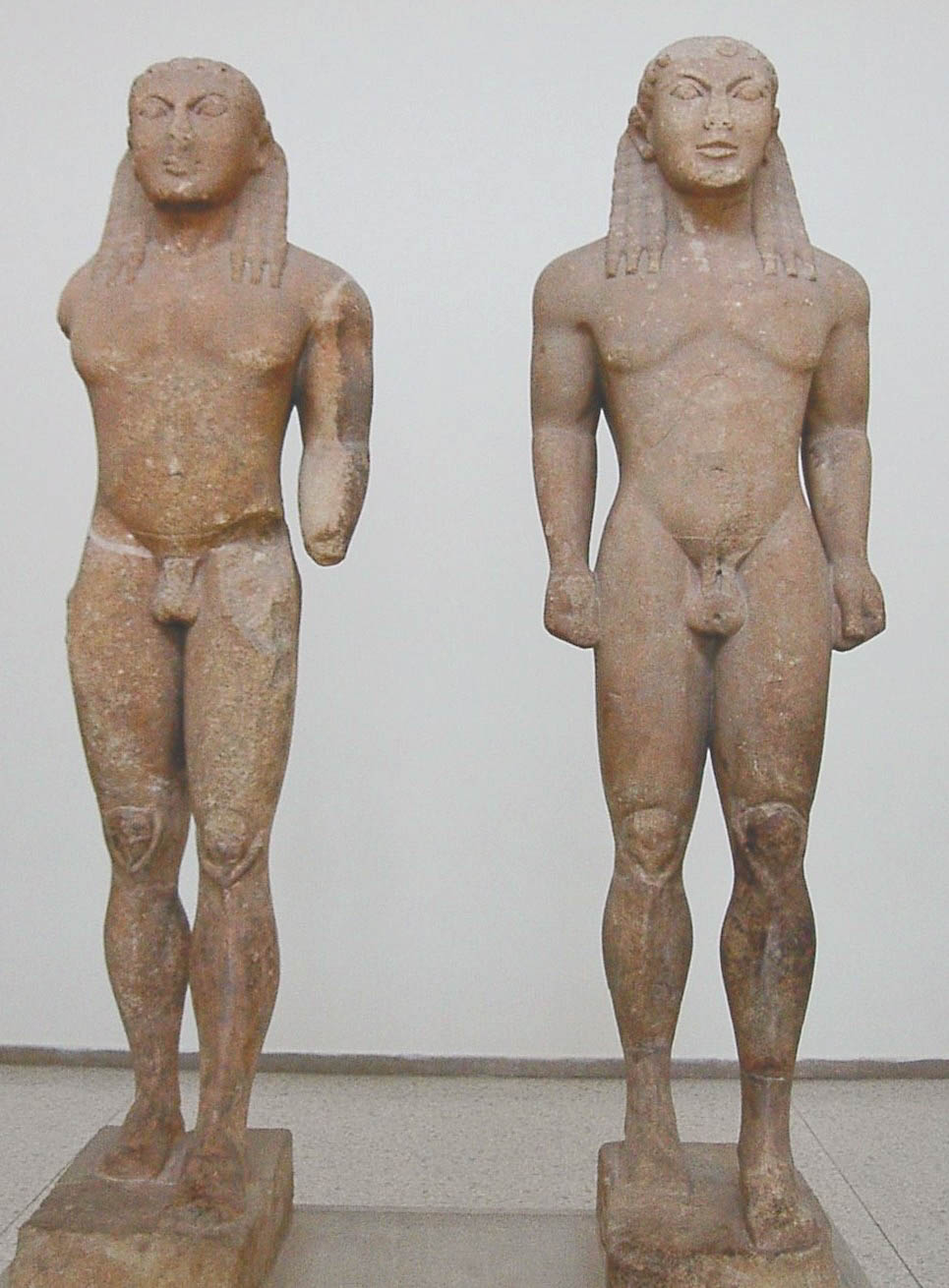
Cleobis and Biton

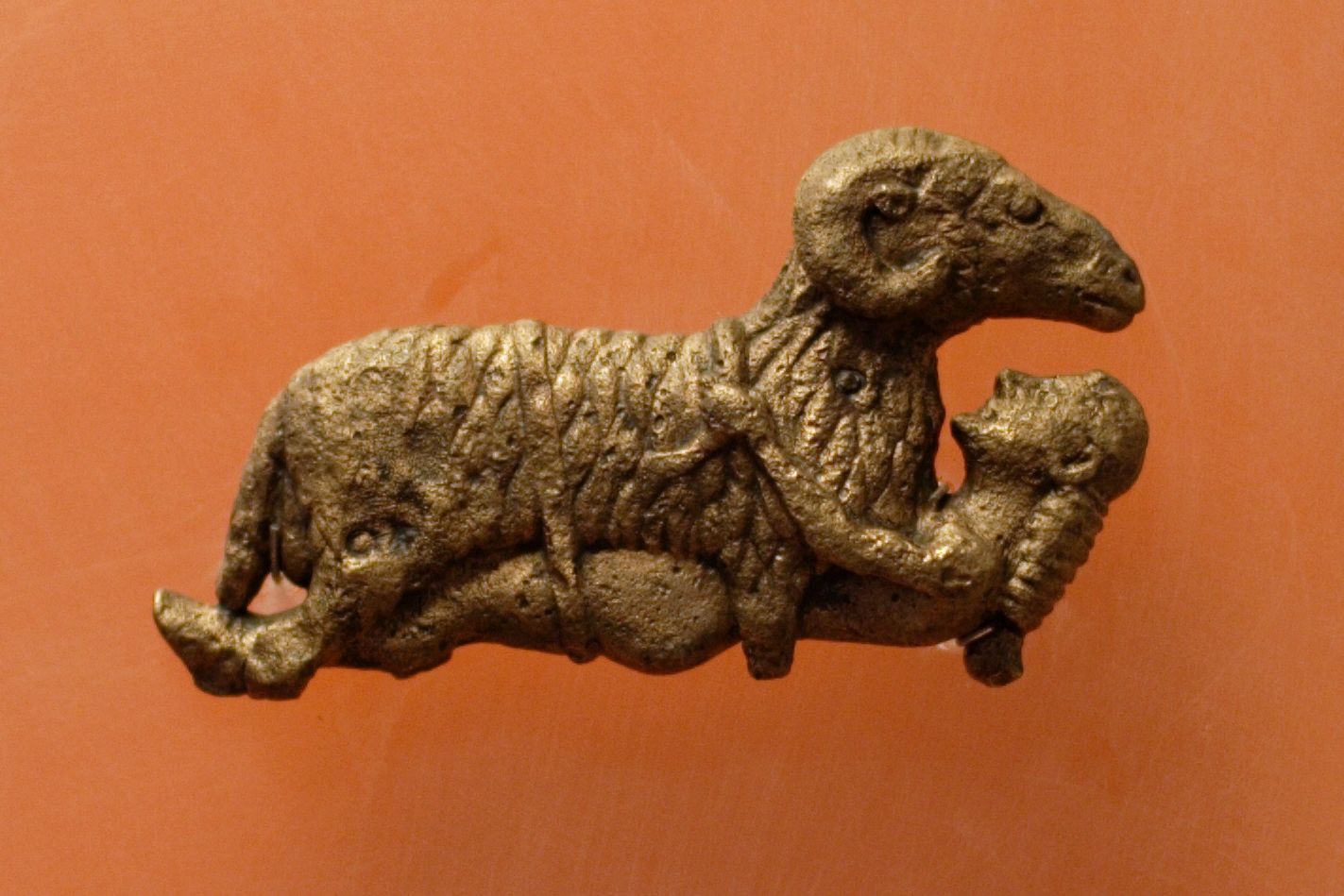
Odysseus under the belly of a ram.

=== Room 4 ===
This is dedicated to the very precious offerings found in a pit on the Sacred Way: the silver statue of a bull and the chryselephantine statues which are thought to represent the Apollonian triad, namely Apollo, Artemis and their mother, Leto. The room is reminiscent of a safe where visitors are let in to admire the precious objects.

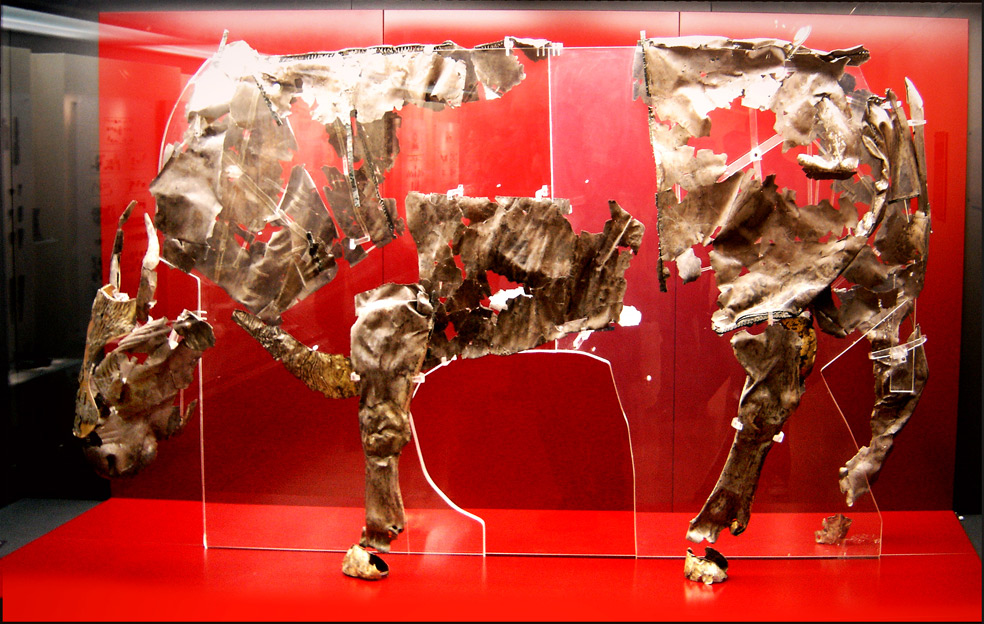
Statue of a Bull.

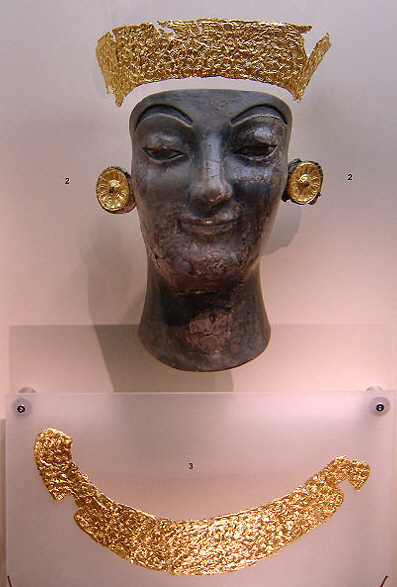
Torso of the chryselephantine sculpture of Artemis.

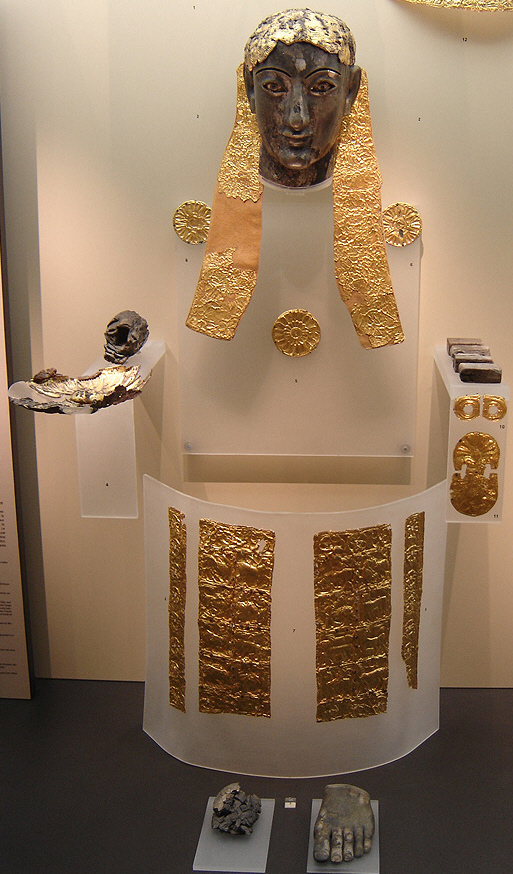
Torso of the chryselephantine sculpture of Apollo.

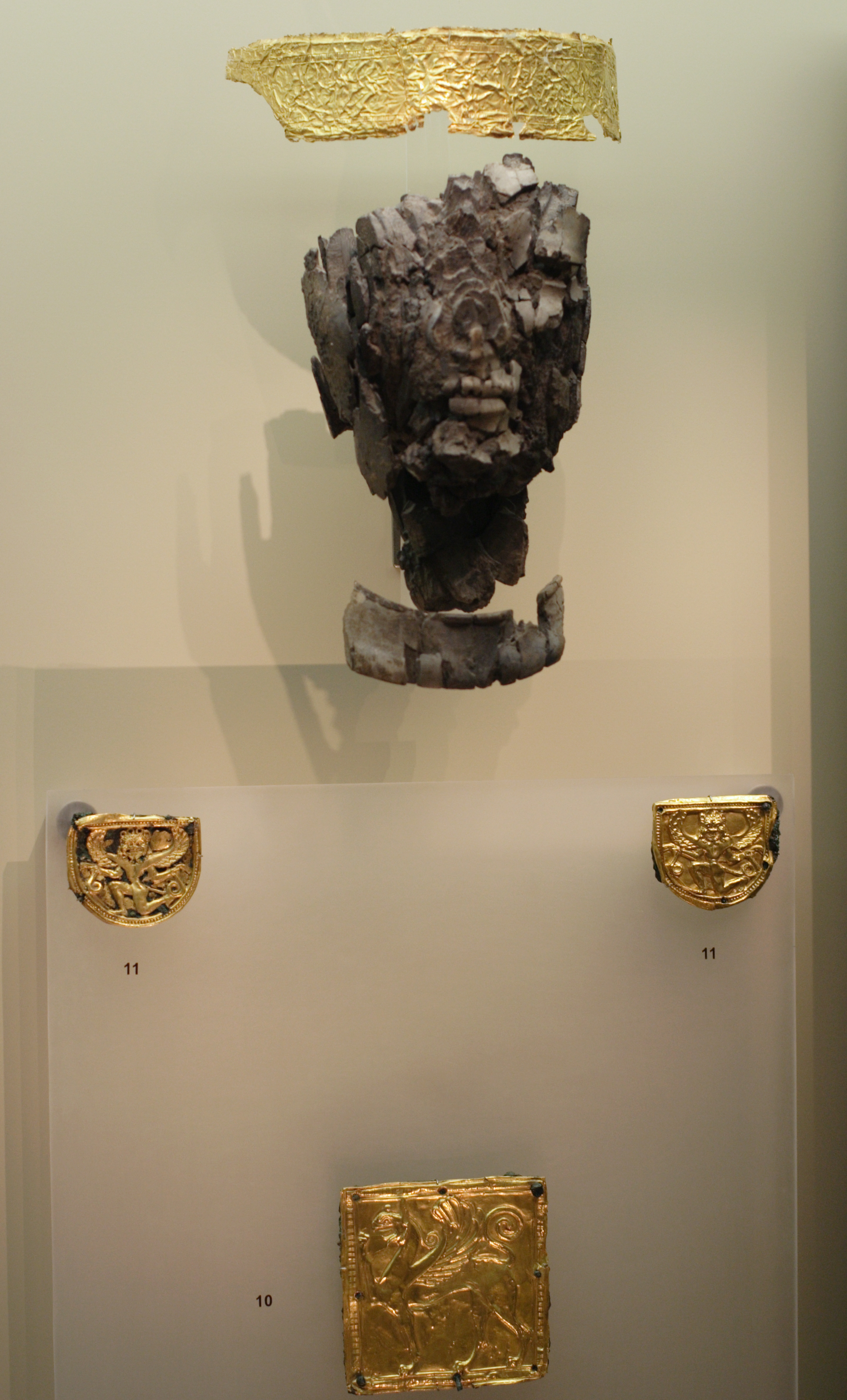
Torso of the chryselephantine sculpture of Leto.

=== Room 5 ===
This room displays the Sphinx of Naxos and the friezes of the Siphnian Treasury. The parts of the treasury displayed include one of the two Korae, i.e. the elegant female figures supporting the vestibule of the treasury, one of the capitals and parts of the frieze. The eastern part of the frieze presents scenes related to the Trojan war, such as the convention of the gods, a battle scene in front of Troy (eastern frieze), a Gigantomachy (northern frieze), the Judgement of Paris (western frieze) and the abduction of a woman (southern frieze), identified either with the abduction of Hippodameia by Pelops or with that of the daughters of Leukippos by the Dioskouroi. The sculptures of the pediment of the treasury are also extant, depicting the fief between Heracles and Apollo for the possession of the Delphic tripod.

The most impressive exhibit, however, is the sphinx. It is an enormous statue which crowned an ionic column and capital, totaling 12 meters in height. The column stood close to the Halos. The sphinx was dedicated by the city of Naxos, a wealthy island of the Aegean in its prime time, i.e. between 575 and 560 BCE. An inscription at the base of the column renews the right of "promanteia" for Naxos in the 4th century BCE.

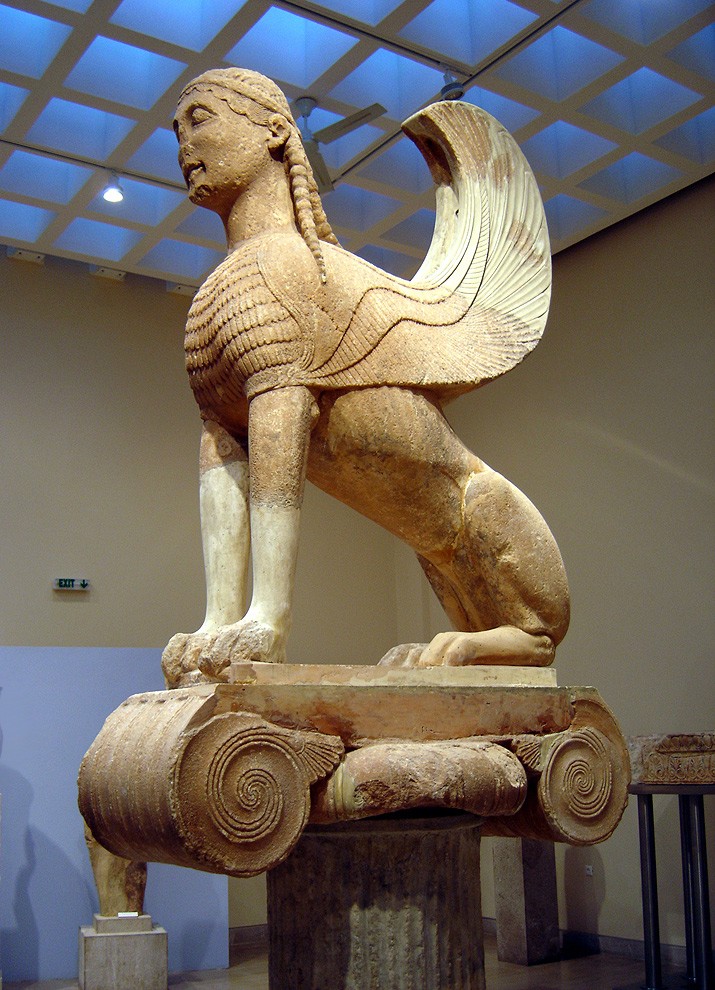
Sphinx of Naxos

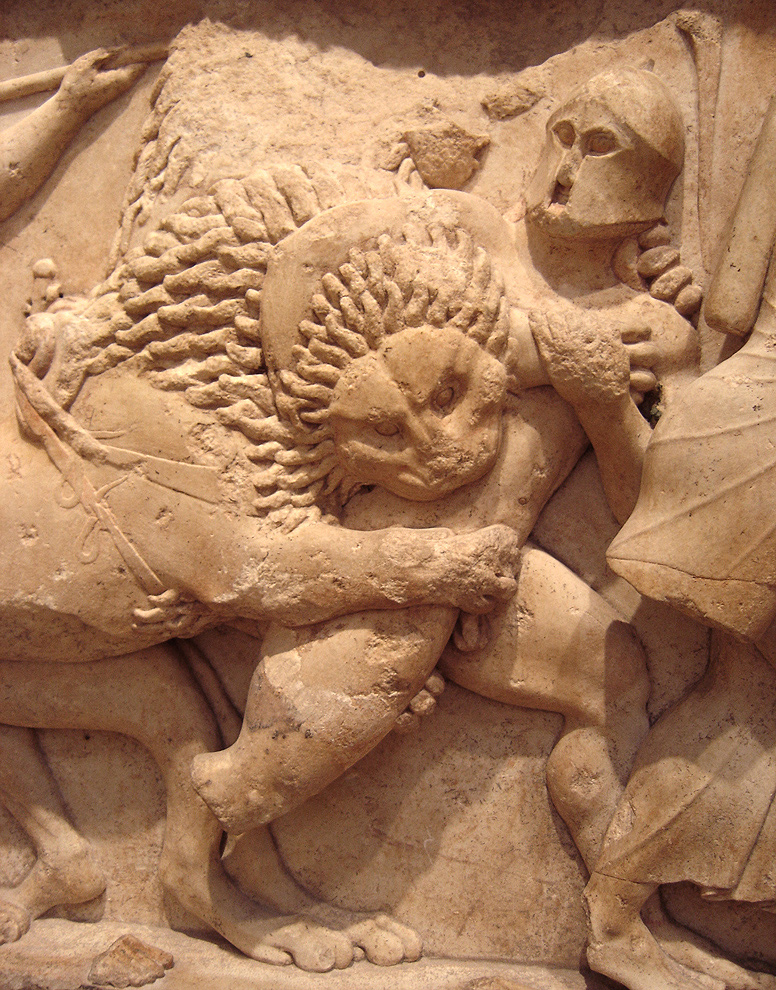
Part of one of the friezes of the Siphnian Treasury

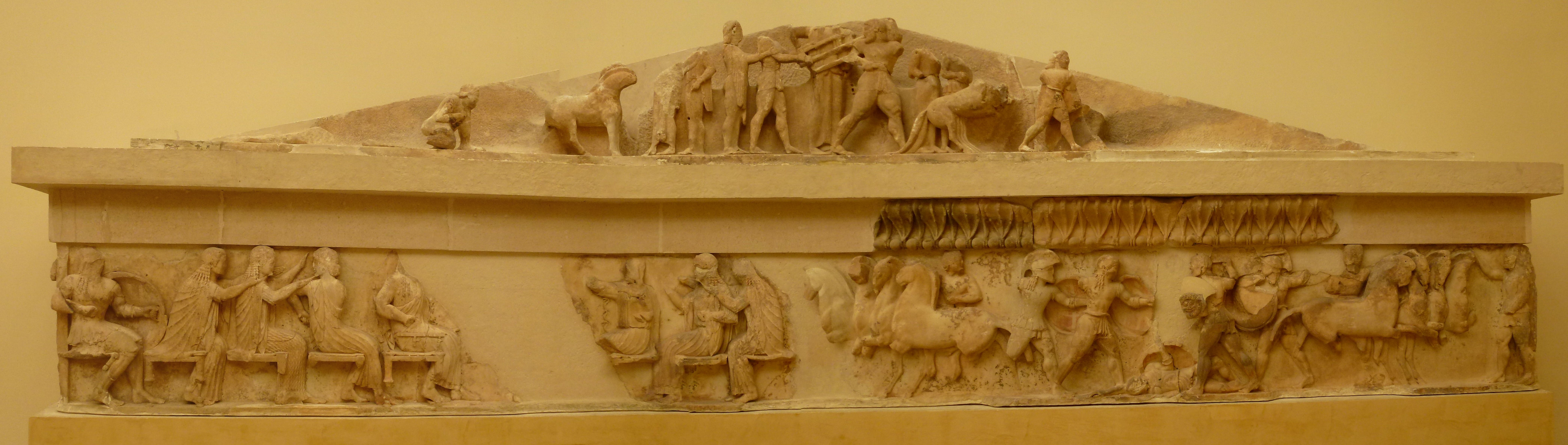
East pediment of the Siphnian Treasury

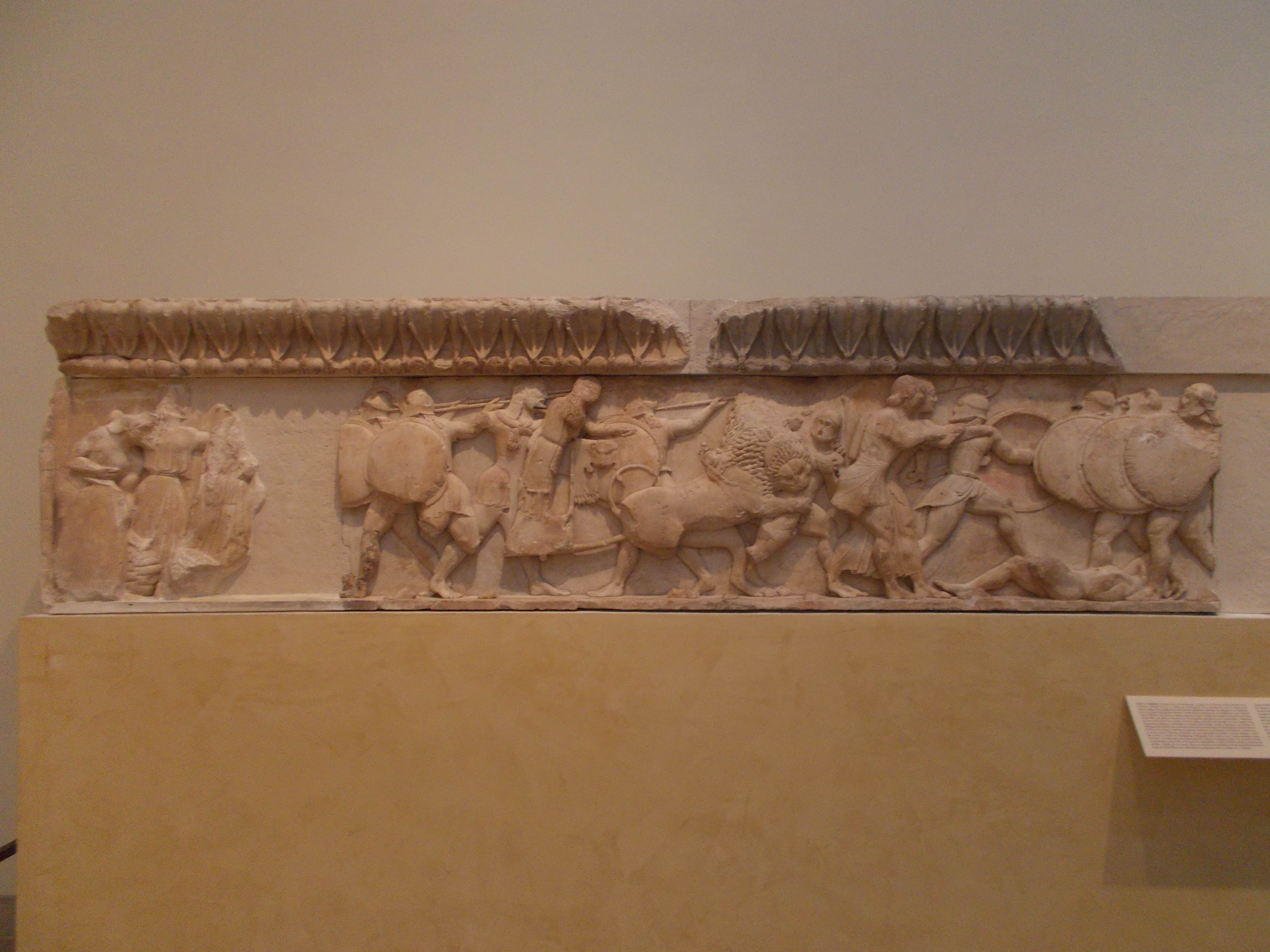
Part of the frieze from to the Treasury of the Siphnians

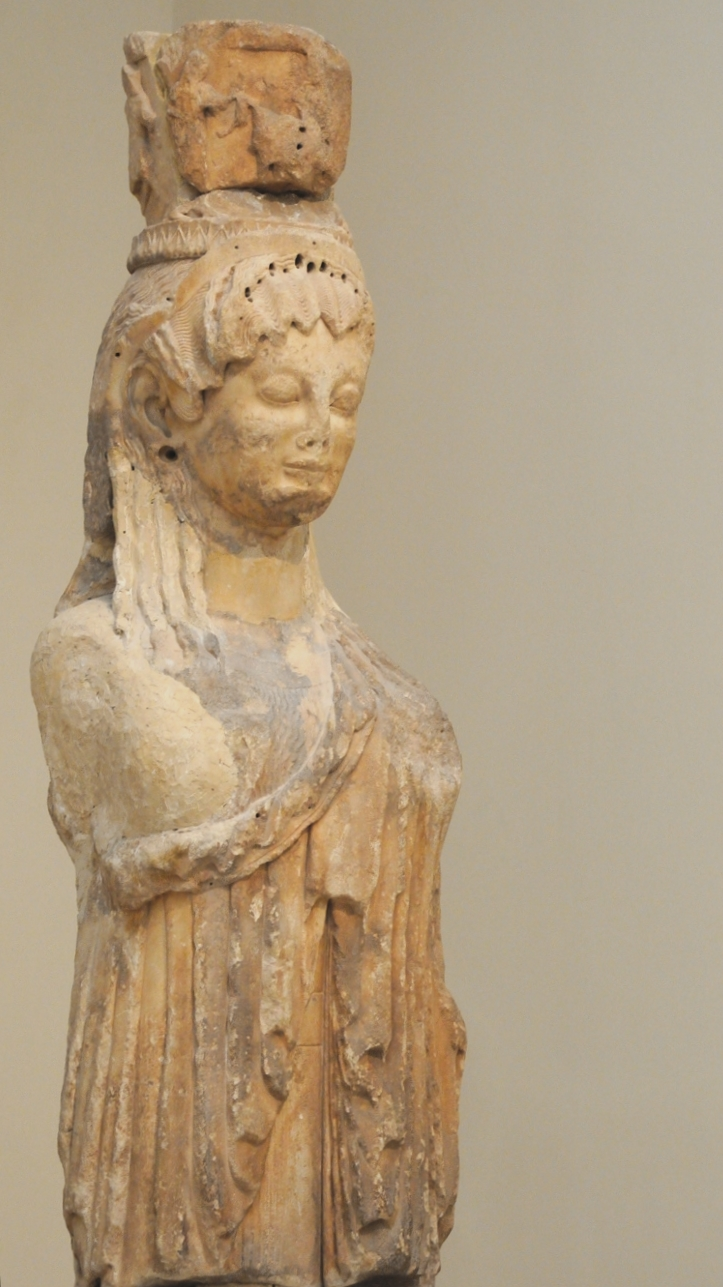
Caryatid from the Siphnian Treasury

=== Room 6 ===
This room contains the archaic and classical facades of the Temple of Apollo. The archaic sculptures, made of Parian marble, include a carriage with four horses, carrying Apollo. To the left of the carriage stood three female figures, possibly the daughters of Kekrops, king of Athens, and to the right three male figures. The scene is identified as the advent of Apollo to Delphi. The central acroterion of the temple depicted a victory (Nike) running with her knee lifted up in the air. The two side acroteria depicted Sphinxes. The western pediment sculptures depicted a Gigantomachy. Both pediments are attributed to the Athenian sculptor Antenor.

The sculptures of the pediments of the 4th century temple were made of Pentelic marble. On the eastern pediment Apollo was seated on a tripod, flanked by Leto, Artemis, and the Muses. On the western pediment was depicted Dionysus, surrounded by female figures, the Thyades. Both pediments are attributed to the sculptors Praxias and Androsthenes.

Sculptures from archaic Temple of Apollo.

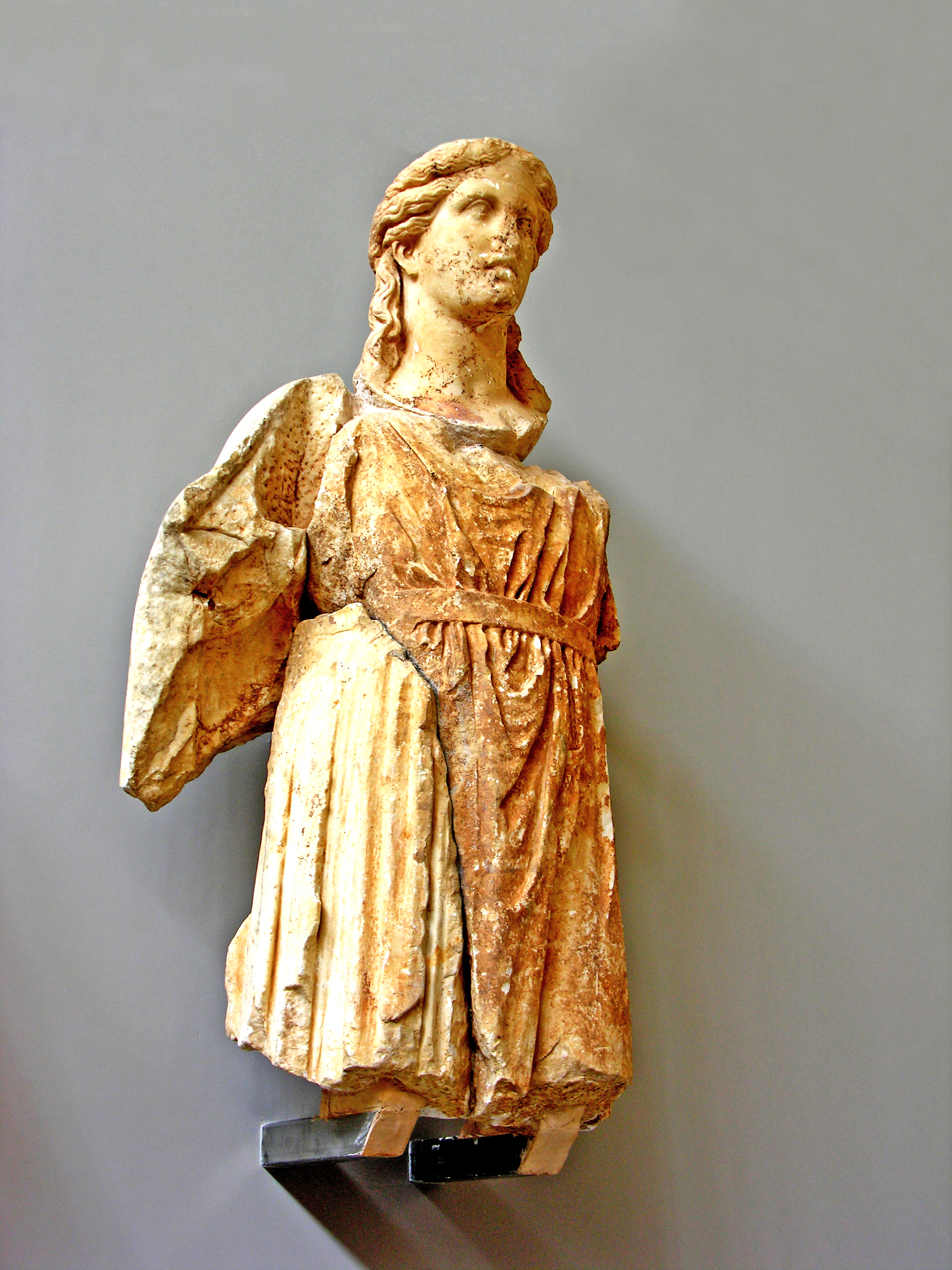
Sculpture of Dionysus, from the classical Temple of Apollo

=== Room 7 ===
These two rooms contain objects from the Treasury of the Athenians; the first room contains the metopes, the second contains acroteria, pedimental sculpture and inscriptions. The two pediments of the Treasury of the Athenians are fragmentary and depict, apparently, the meeting of Theseus and Peirithus (eastern pediment) and Heracles in a battle scene (western pediment). Twenty-seven out of the thirty metopes of the treasury are also preserved. They bear representations in deep relief. The east side metopes depict an Amazonomachy. The south side metopes depict the heroic deeds of Theseus, such as the killing of the Minotaur, the bull of Marathon, the hero with an amazon, the hero with the goddess Athena, the fight against the bandit Cercyon and against Skiron. On the north side are depicted nine heroic deeds of Heracles, such as the fight against Geryones, in four consequent metopes, in an unusual "narrative" style.

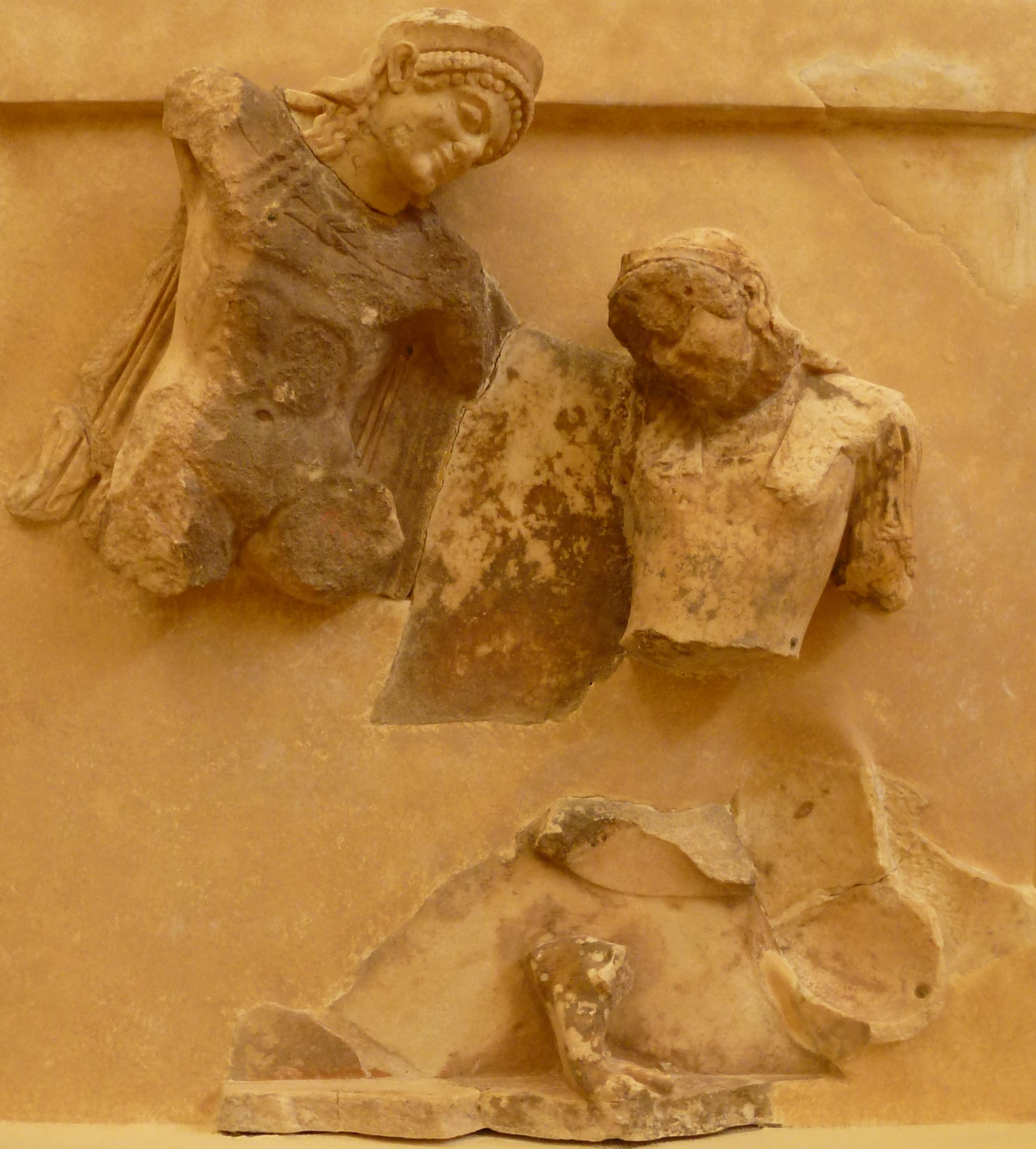
Metope of the Treasury of the Athenians

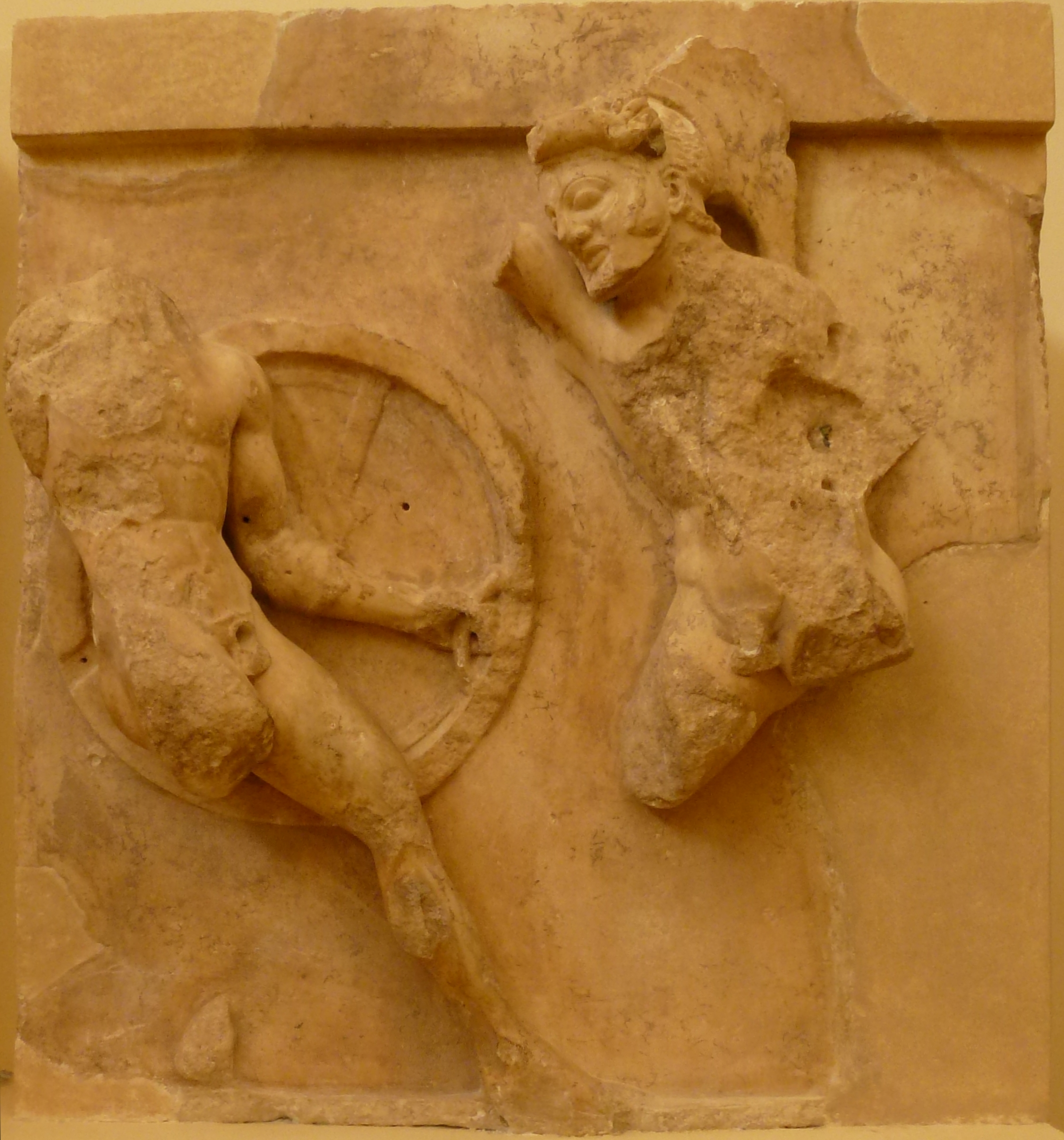
Metope of the Treasury of the Athenians

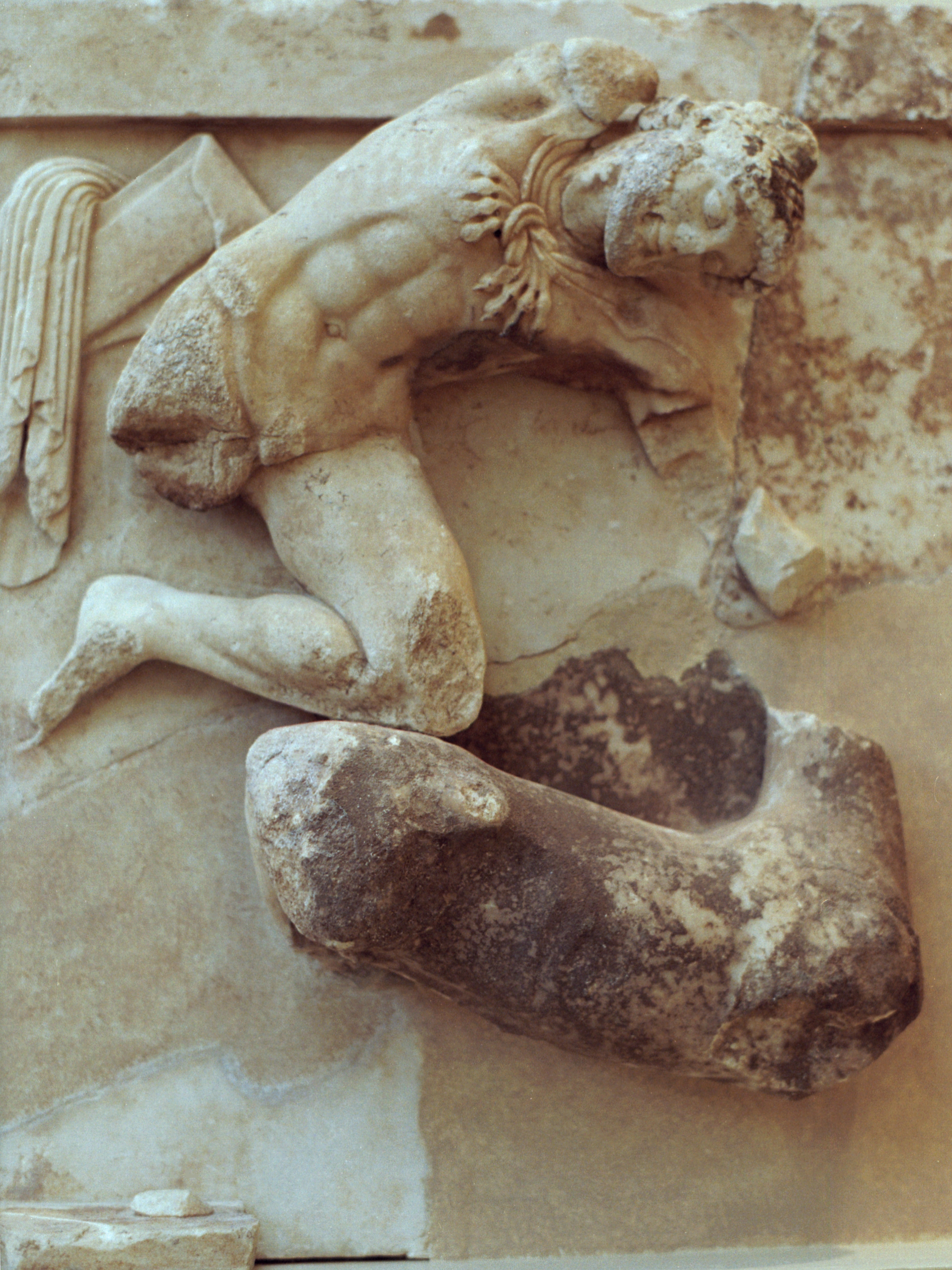
Metope of the Treasury of the Athenians

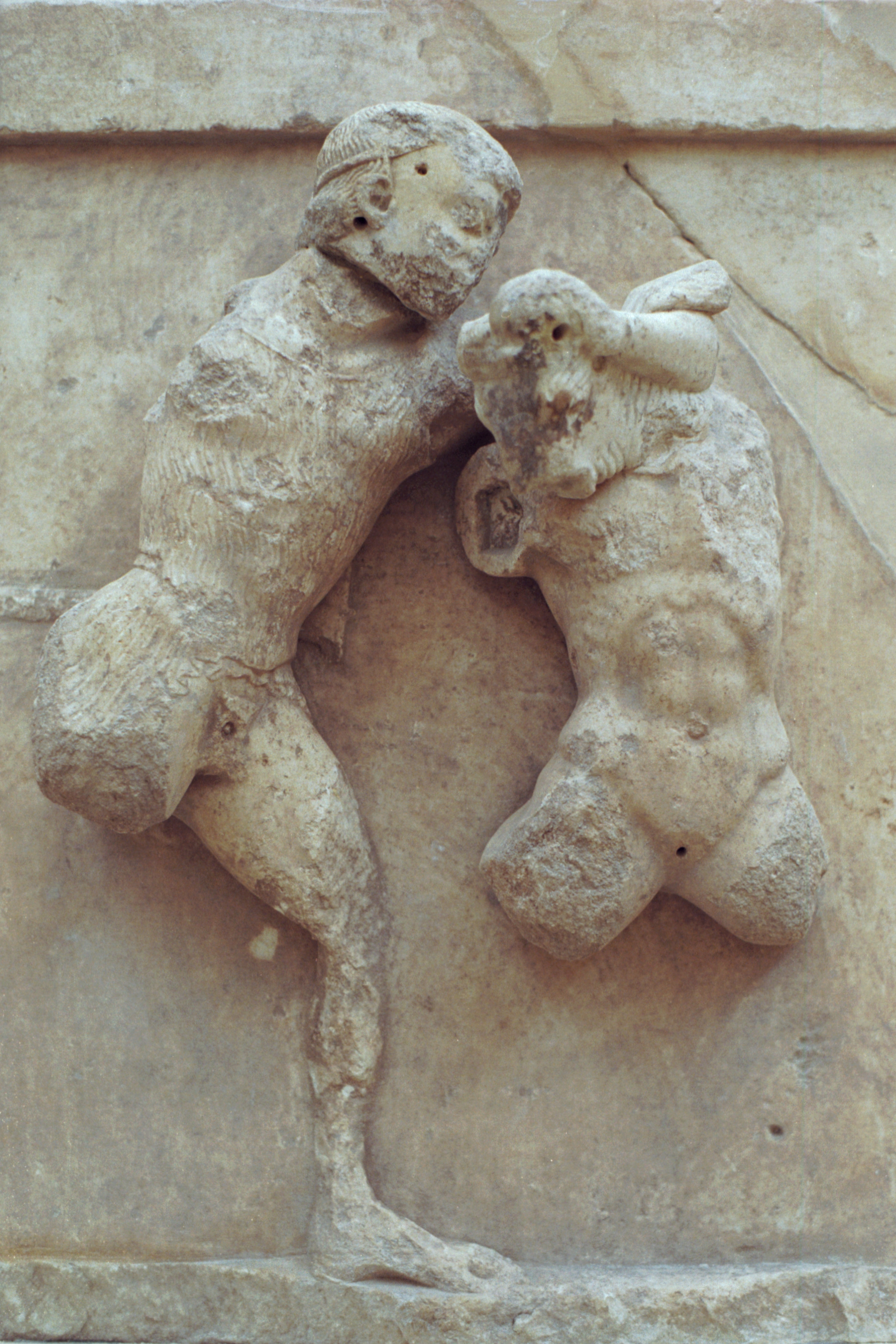
Metope of the Treasury of the Athenians

=== Room 8 ===
The room contains the fragments of the Delphic Hymns and the Attic white-ground kylix with the depiction of Apollo playing the lyre.

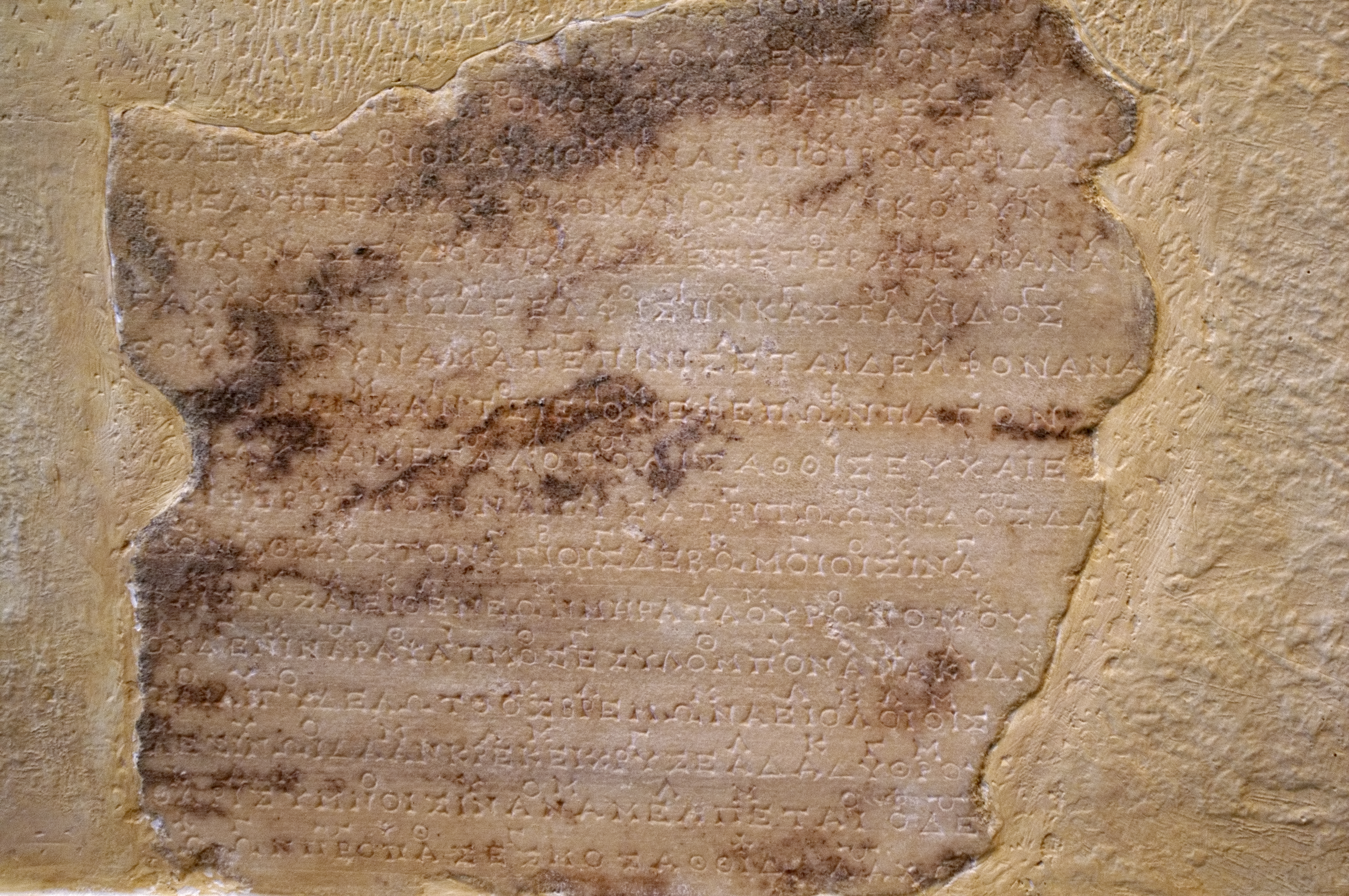
First Delphic Hymn, 1st and 2nd verse

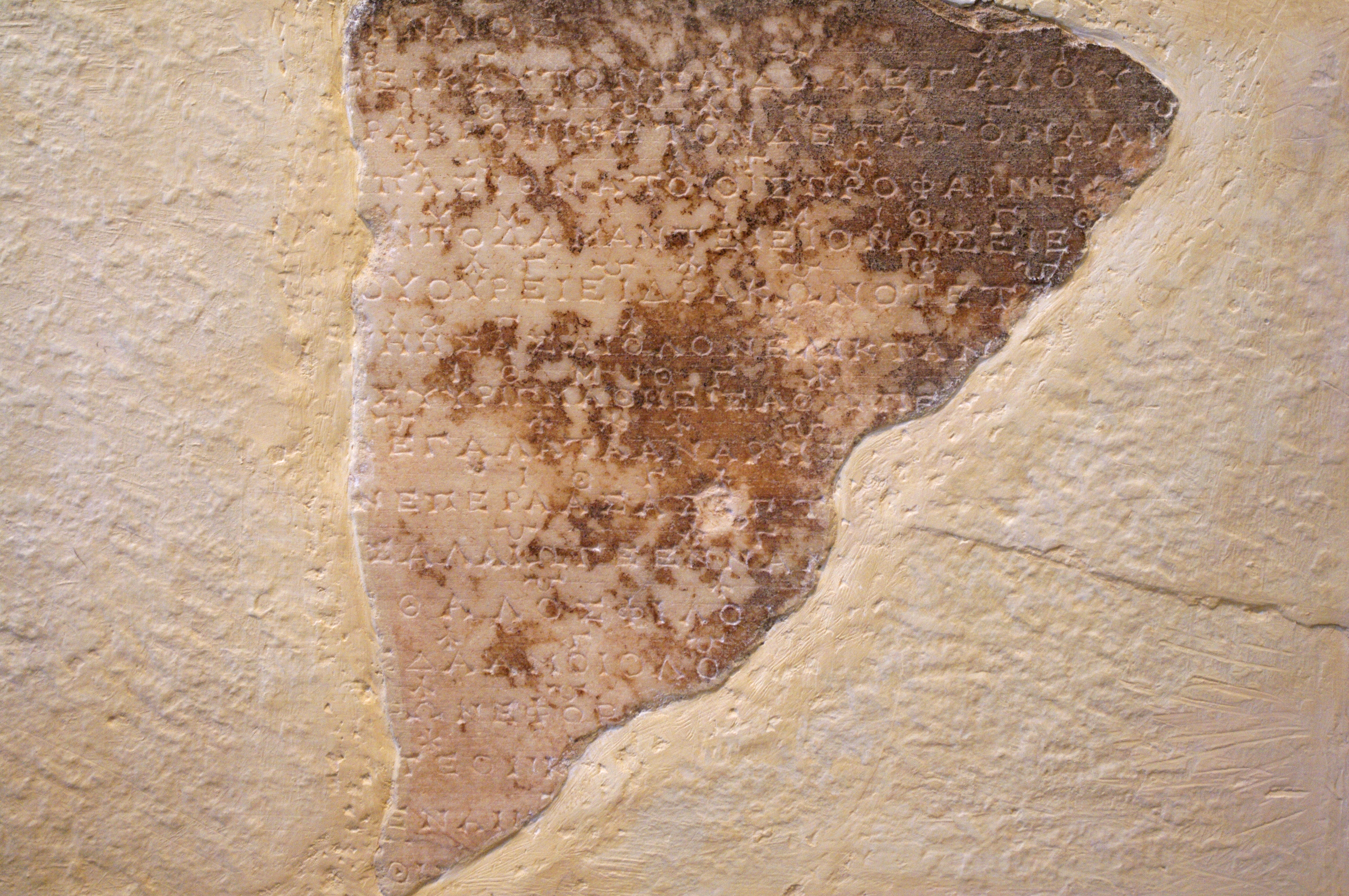
First Delphic Hymn, 3rd verse

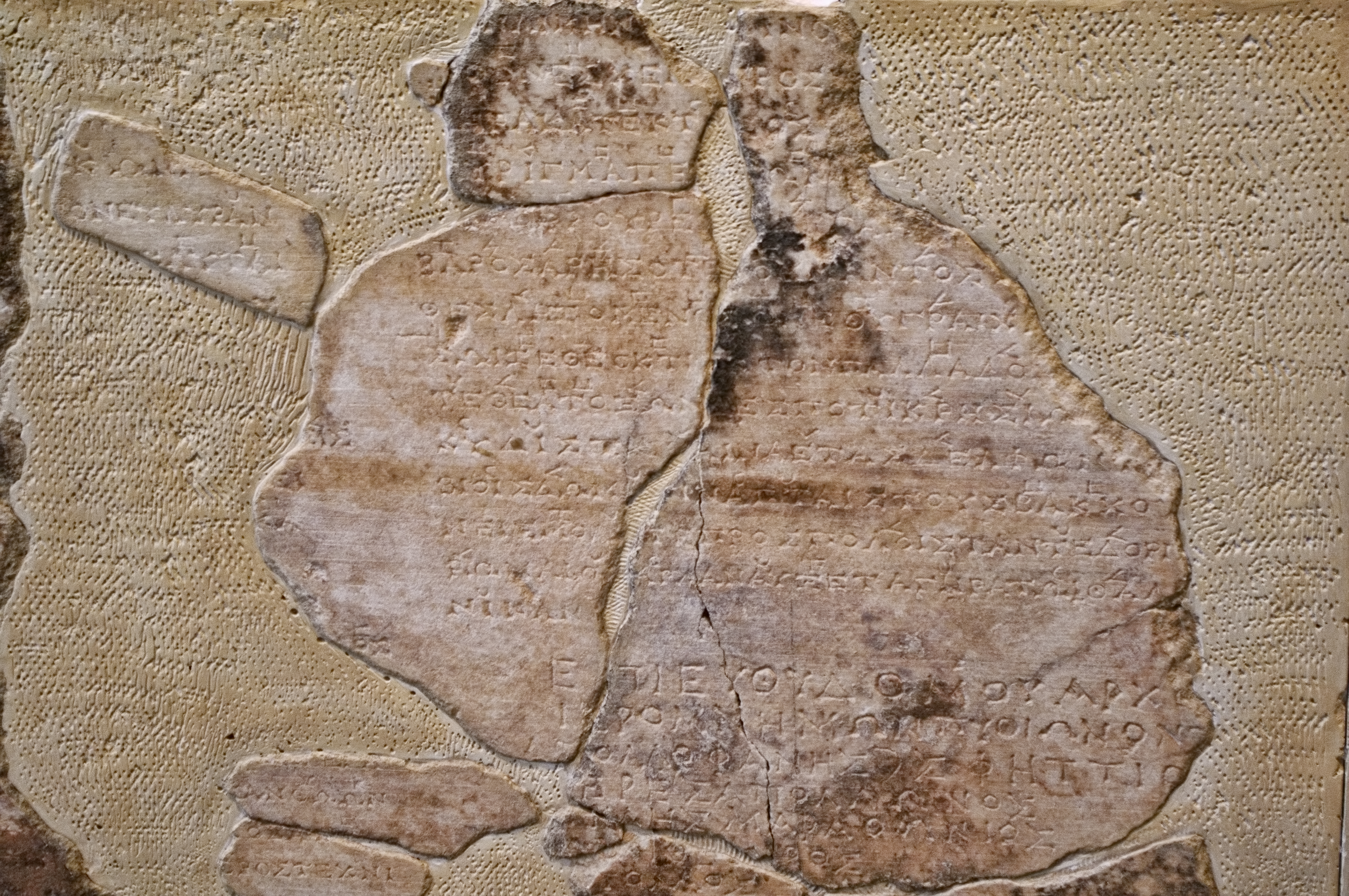
Second Delphic Hymn

=== Rooms 9 and 10 ===
The objects in these two rooms come from the Temple of Athena Pronaia. Among them stand out sculptures from the Treasury of the Massaliots and the Doric Treasury. Two acroteria in the form of running female figures have been attributed to the temple of Athena. Architectural members on the north wall of the room such as simae, gutters in the form of lion-head and acroteria in the form of anthemia, as well as parts of Nike acroteria belong also to various buildings of the sanctuary, date to the late archaic and classical periods and preserve traces of their initial colours. In the middle of the room there are free-standing cases, in which are displayed three bronze figurines, namely a Corinthian figurine of a man playing the double flute (460–450 BCE), two naked athletes dated to the same period and coming from an Attic workshop, and a magnificent bronze incense-burner in the form of a "peplophoros", a female figure holding above her head a cauldron for burning the incense. All three figurines were found in the pit of the Sacred Way along with the chryselephantine statues and several other finds.

Along the western side there is a case displaying bronze figurines dated to the first half of the 5th century BCE, as well as parts of larger bronze statues. Among the latter stand out the part of a crane and the part of a himation decorated with maeander motifs with inlay copper.

Room 10, on the other hand, contains parts of the Tholos of Delphi, the round building standing out in the sanctuary of Athena Pronaia, dated to the first quarter of the 4th century BCE. Two rows of simae with lion-heads and two rows of metopes have been found. The first row of metopes decorated the external side and the row with the smaller figures belonged to the internal side of the pteron. The sculpted decoration was complete with acroteria in the form of women dressed in floating peplos. The outer metopes depicted an Amazonomachy and a Centauromachy. The sculptures of the Tholos date to 380–370 BCE and constitute magnificent specimens of late Classical sculpture, reminding of the sculptures of the Asclepeion of Epidaurus. Several of them had been damaged in Late Antiquity.

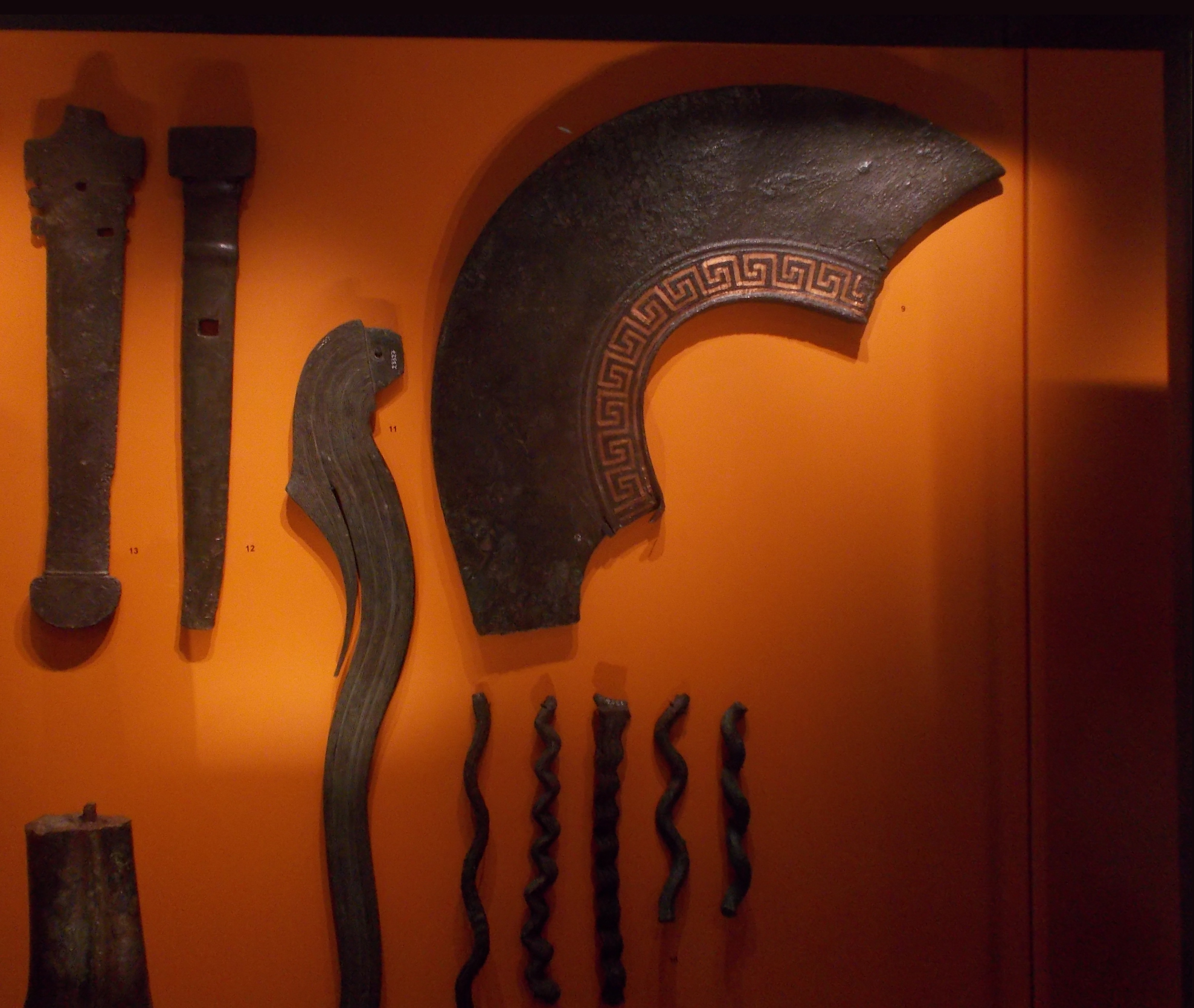
Bronze sculptures of the 5th century BCE

=== Room 11 ===
The room contains Late Classical and early Hellenistic objects, among which the Dancers of Delphi and the ex voto of Daochos. Daochos II was the tetrarch of Thessaly between 336 and 332 BCE. The ex voto consisted of a rectangular base 11 meters long which bore openings for supporting nine statues, discovered around it. Eight of the statues were identified by inscriptions. From right to left were depicted possibly a seated Apollo, next to him Acnonios, former tetrarch of Thessaly, with his three sons, Agias, Telemachus, and Agelaus, victors in various athletic games, then Daochos I, Daochos II and finally Sisyphus II, the latter's son. Some of the figures, at least, have been attributed to Lysippus.

The Dancers of Delphi on the other hand, is a column identified due to the inscription of its base. It was dedicated by the Athenians, made of Pentelic marble. The column ended in a composition consisting of acanthus leaves out of which sprang three female figures with their hands lifted, as if dancing. They probably held a tripod (not extant) crowned by the omphalos displayed also in the same room. Among the other important exhibits of the room counts a statue of Apollo in the Patroos type and the statue of a man wearing the himation, dated to the 5th century BCE as well as the statue of an aged man with a himation leaving the right shoulder and the breast uncovered, identified as a priest of Apollo or as a philosopher and dated to 280 BCE.

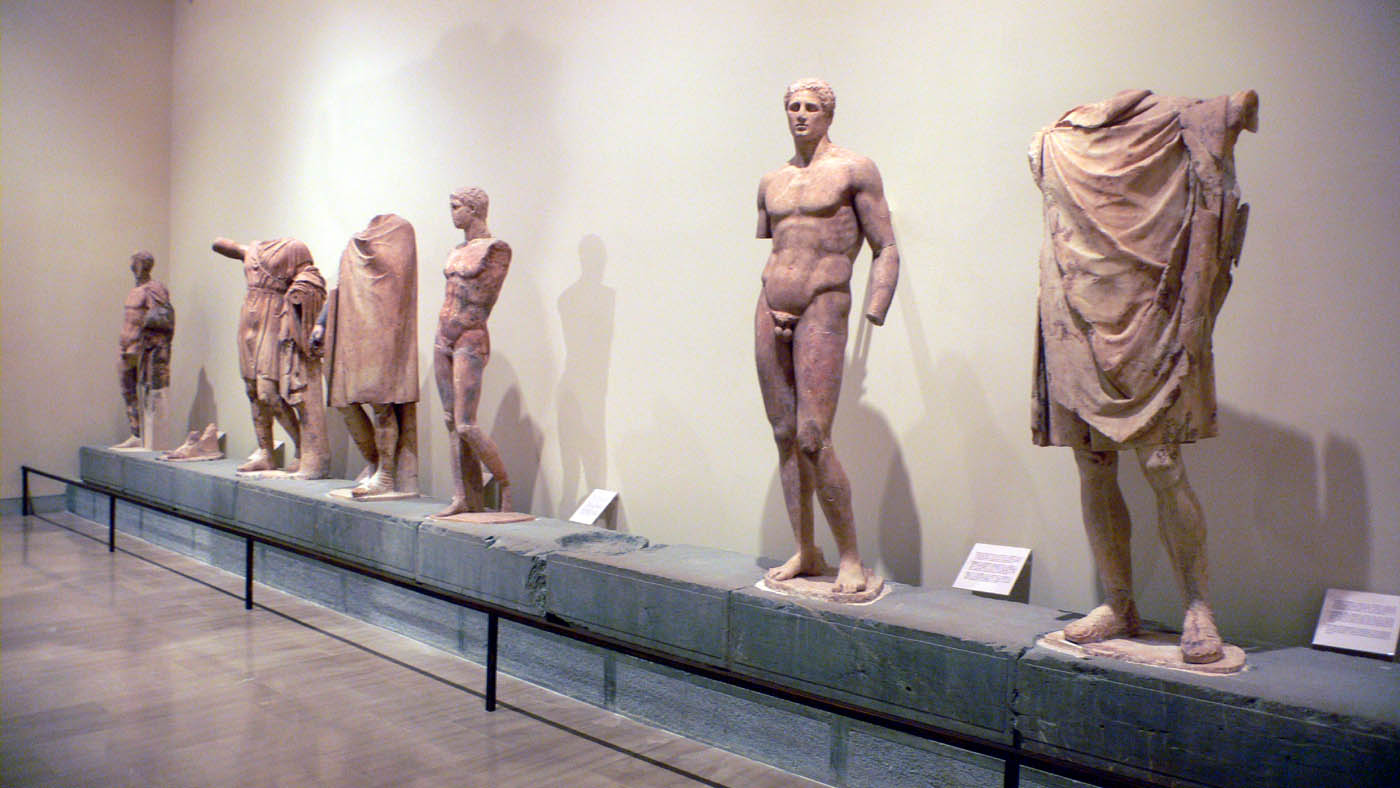
Dedication of Daochos

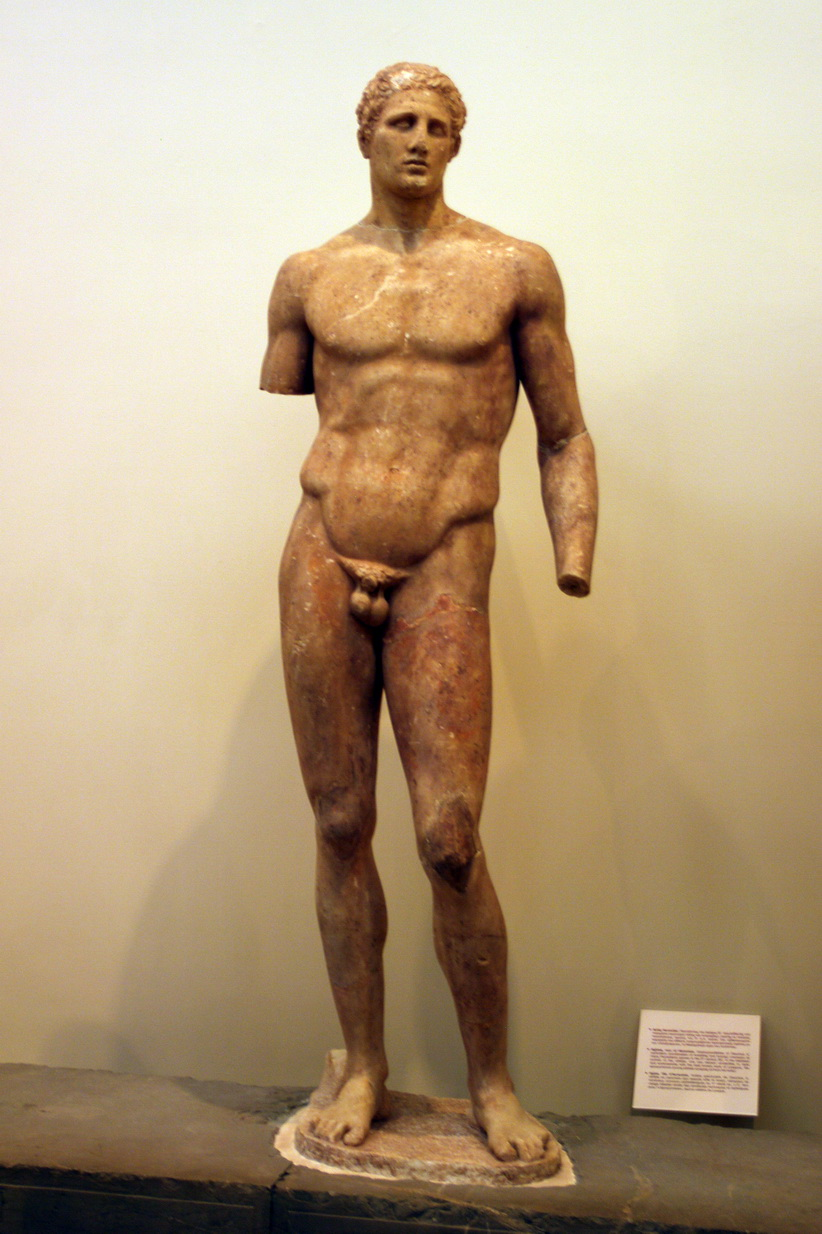
Statue of Agias of Pharsala, possibly by Lysippos or his son Euthykrates, part of the dedication of Daochos

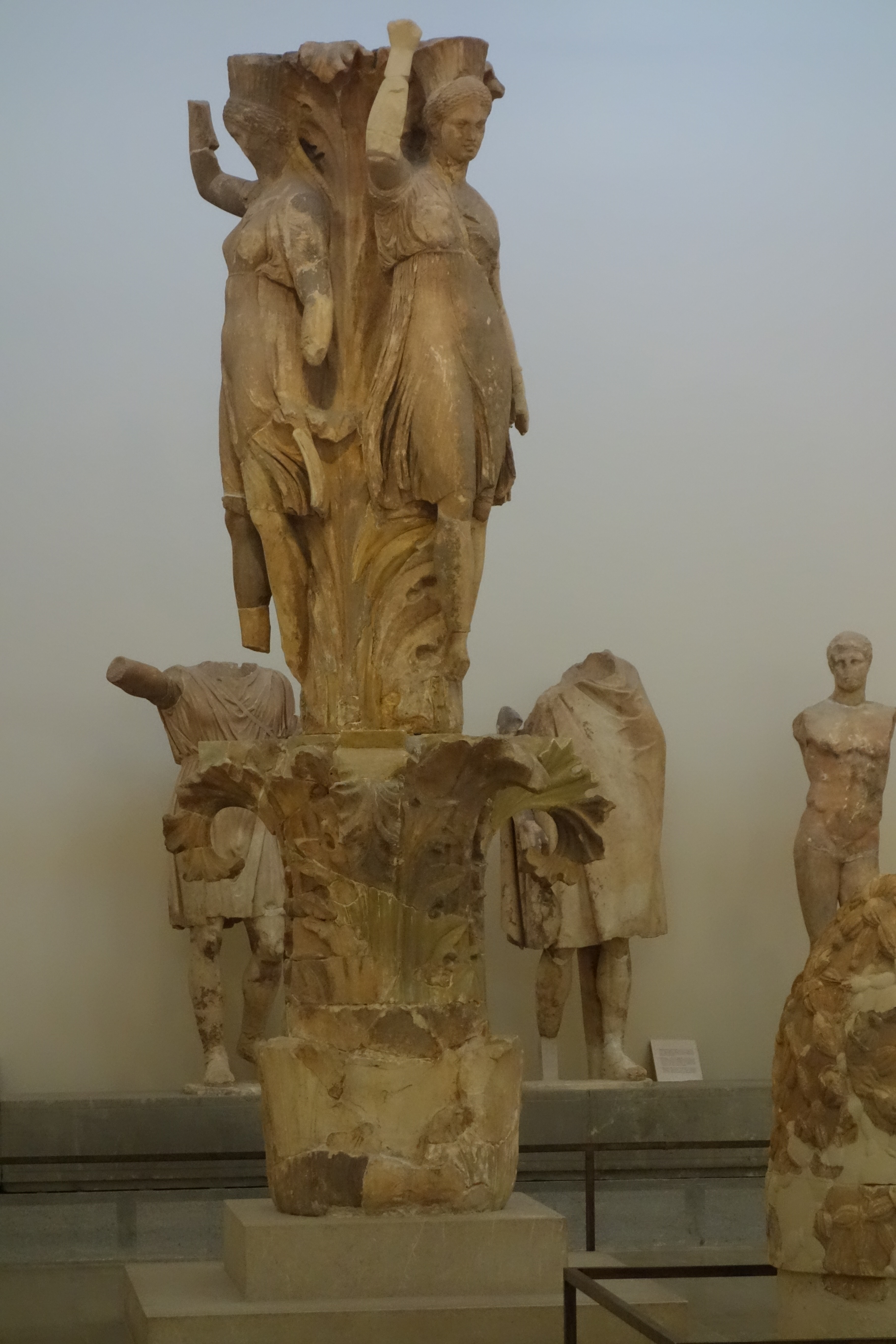
Dancers of Delphi

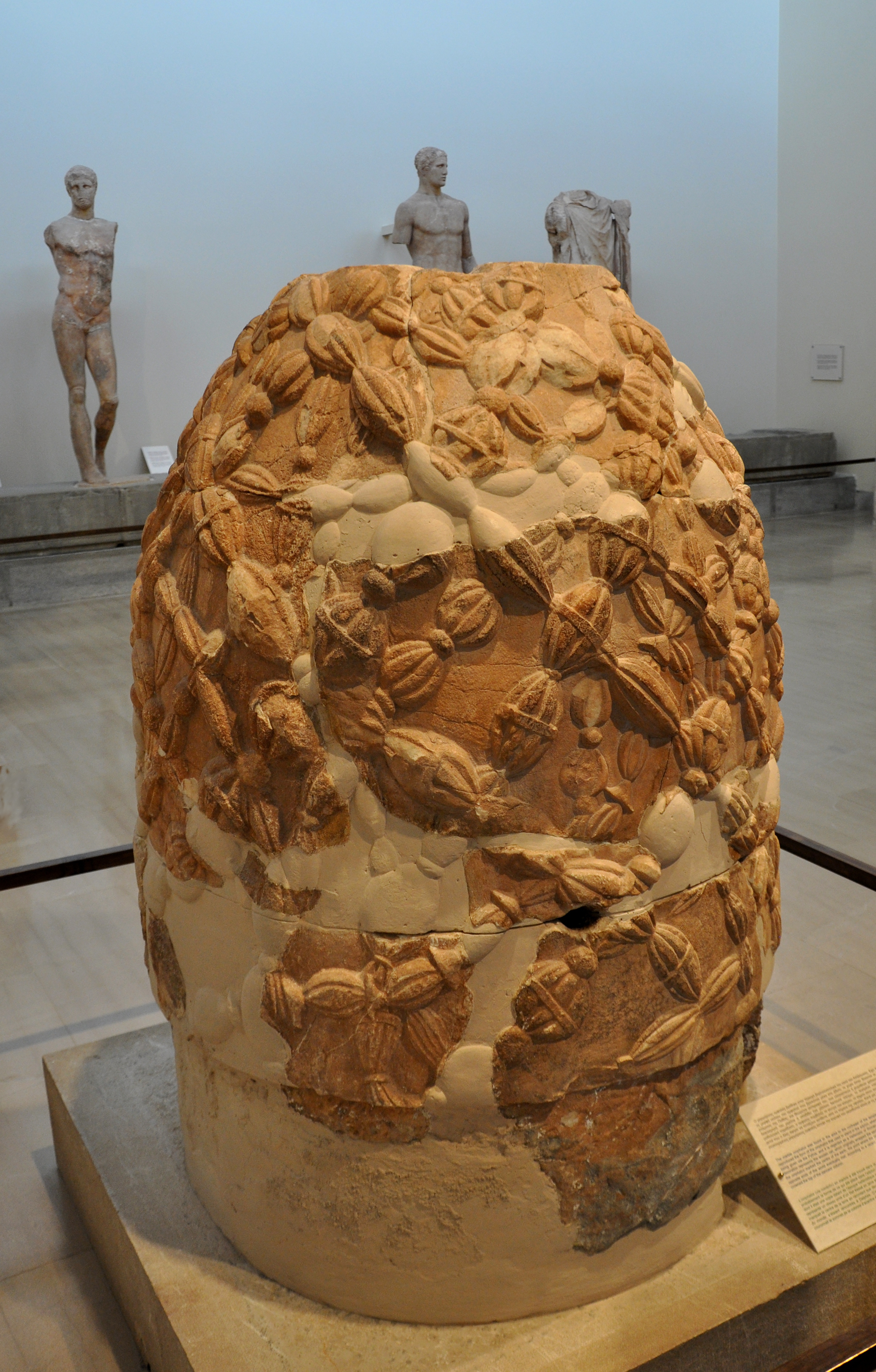
Omphalos

=== Room 12 ===
Room 12 contains Late Hellenistic and Roman objects, including a famous statue of Antinous. The main exhibit of the statue of Antinous, favorite of the emperor Hadrian; it is probably one of the best specimens of the depictions of the young man which were erected all over the Roman Empire after his untimely death under order of the emperor. Close to Antinous stands a head of a man probably depicting Titus Quinctius Flamininus, the Roman general who conquered Delphi in 198 BCE. In the middle of the room stands a round altar made of Pentelic marble and coming from the Sanctuary of Athena Pronaia. It is decorated in three bands with cyma recta and astragalus patterns and twelve female figures. It dates to the 2nd century BCE. Another important exhibit is the pedestal with the frieze in relief constituting the Monument of Aemilius Paullus.

Along the south side of the room are displayed parts of the Roman frieze decorating the theatre. They consist of depictions of scenes from the life and deeds of Heracles, such as the garden of the Hesperides, Cerberus, the lion of Nemea, a centaur, Antaeus, the belt of Hippolyte, the horses of Diomedes, etc.

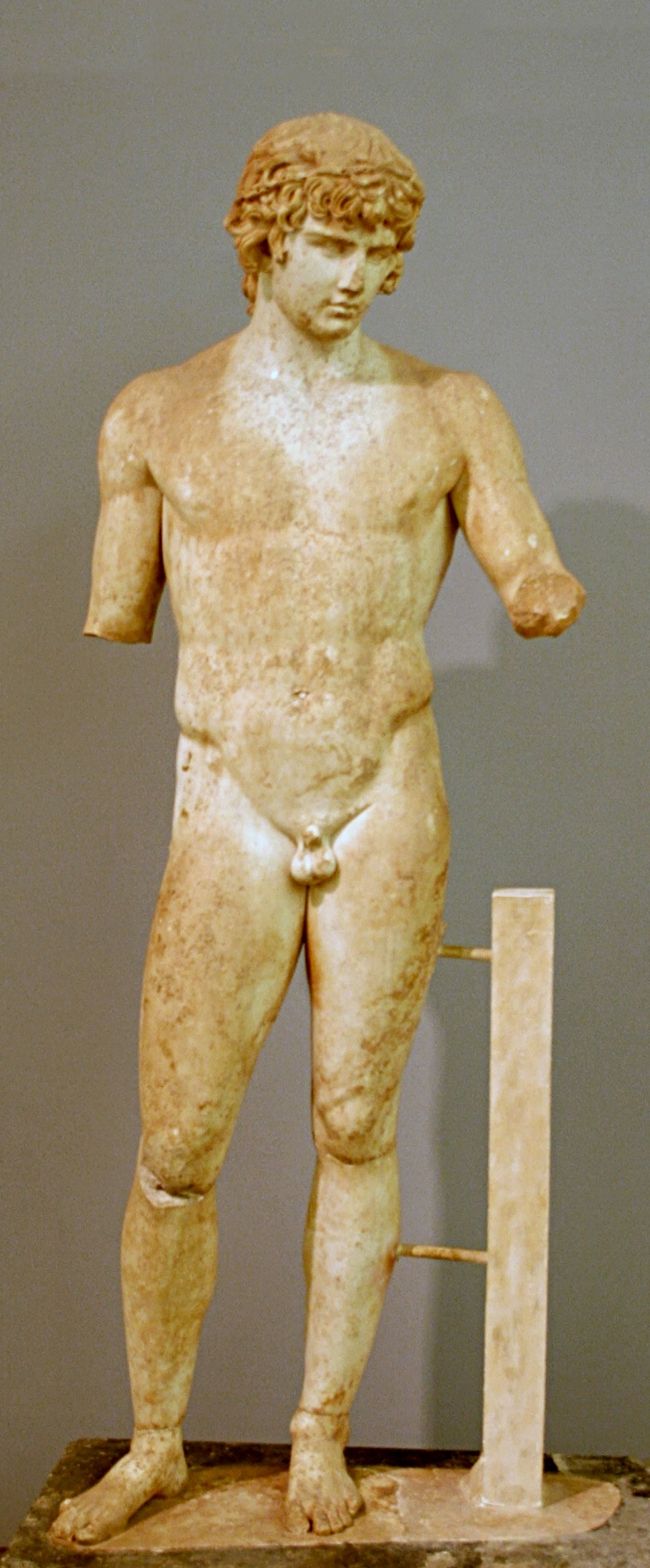
Antinous, Parian marble, time of Hadrian

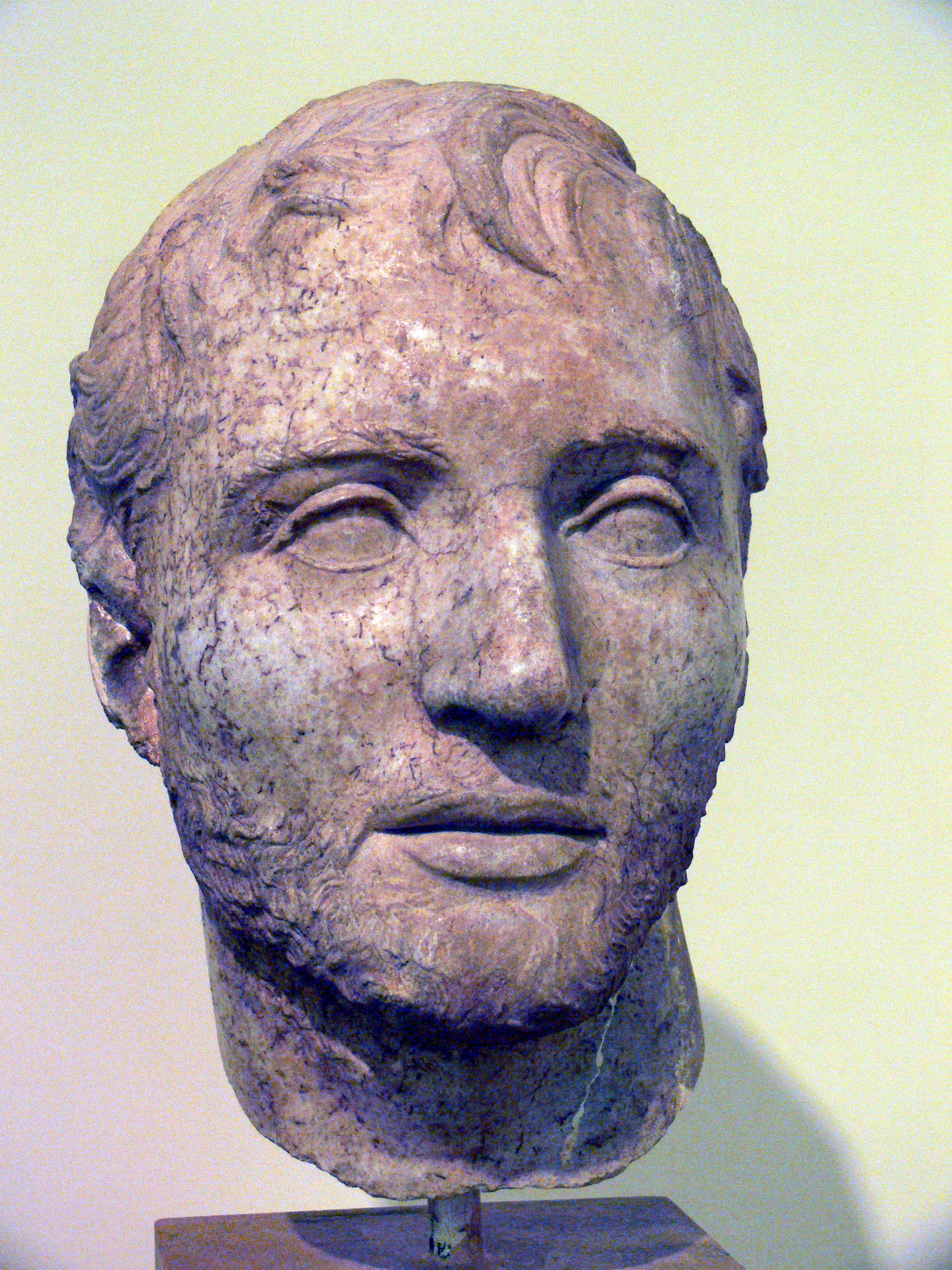
Bust of the Roman consul Titus Quinctius Flamininus

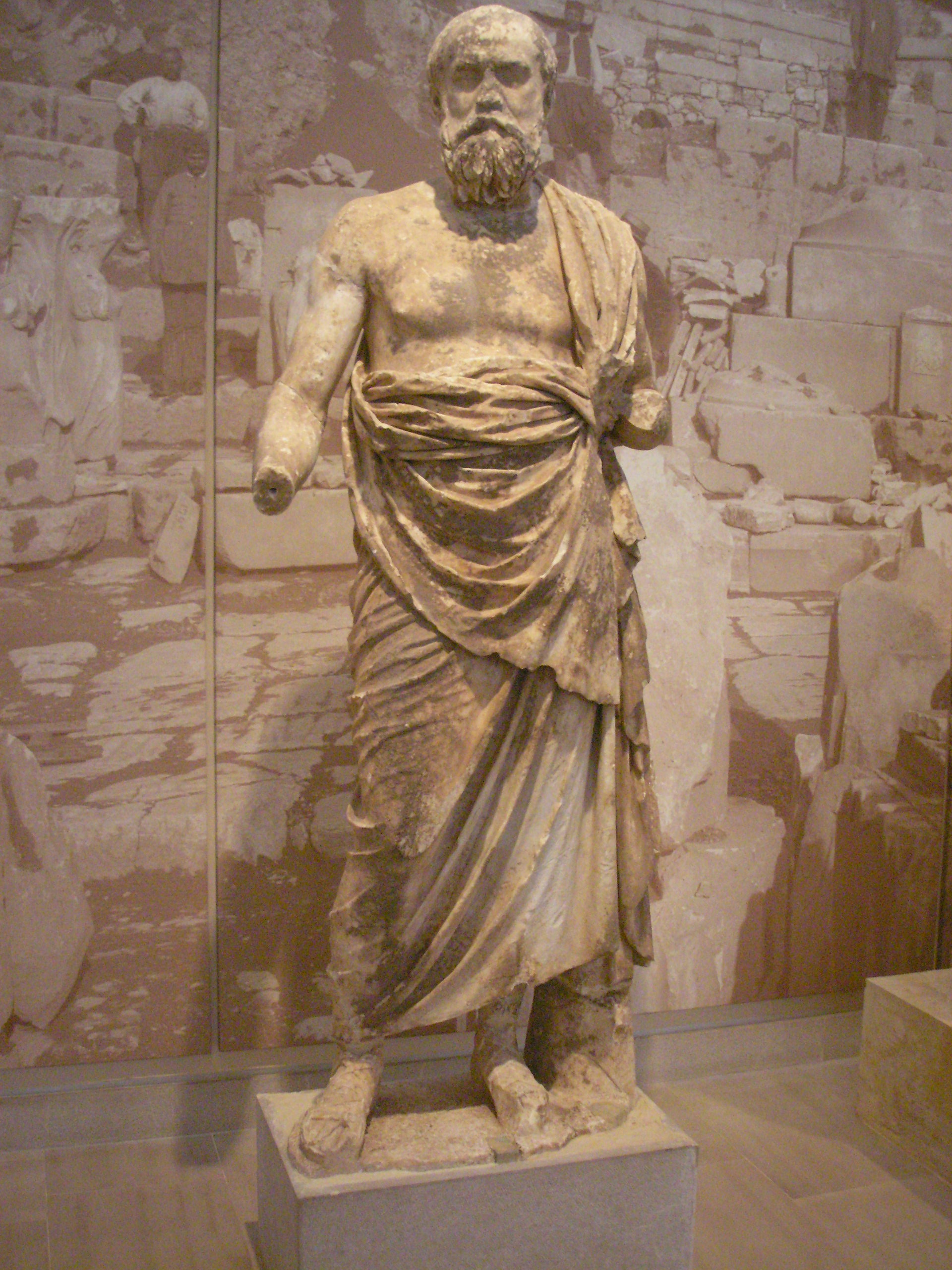
Statue of a philosopher, said to be Plutarch or Plato

=== Room 13 ===
This is the room of the Charioteer. The statue constituted one of the finest specimens of 5th century bronze sculpture, of the so-called austere style. It belonged to a larger complex including the chariot, the horses, and possibly a stable boy.

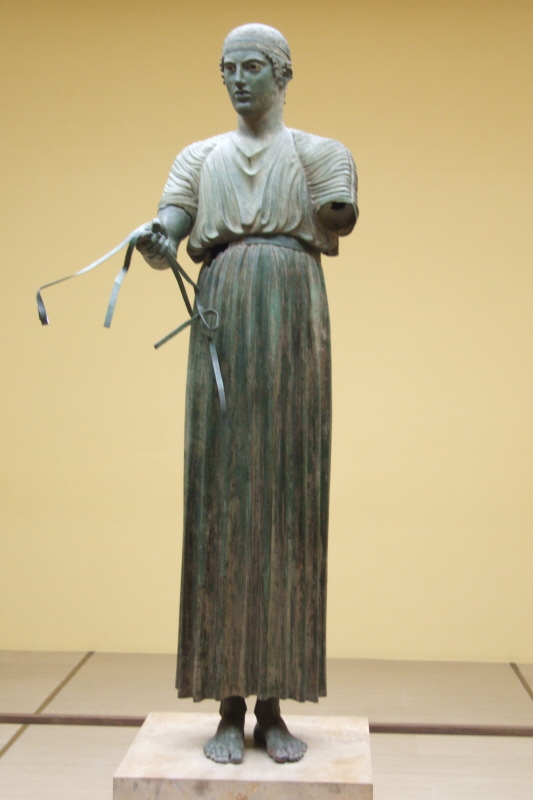
Charioteer of Delphi, bronze, 475 BCE,

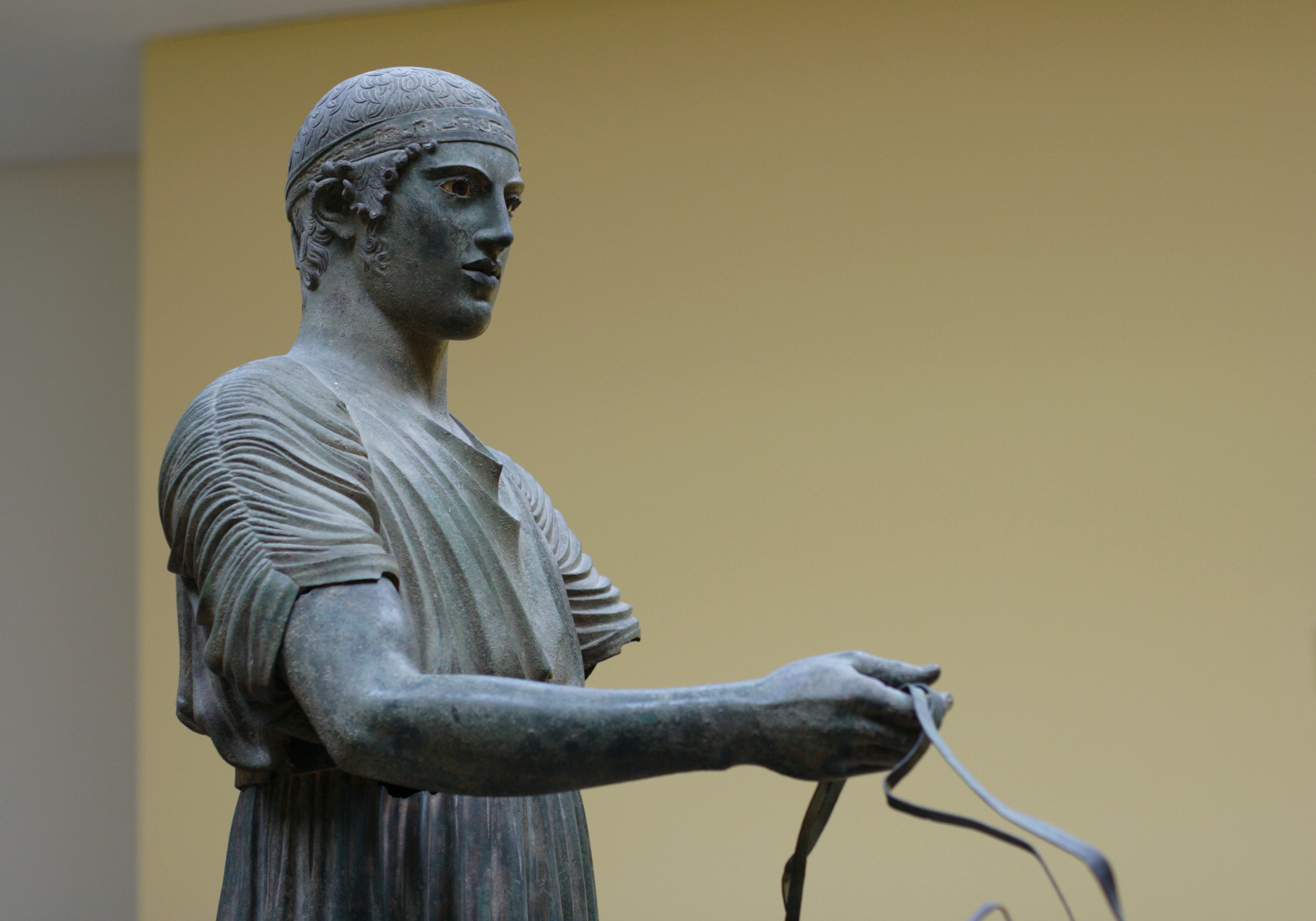
Another view of the Charioteer

=== Room 14 ===
This last room is devoted to the final years of the sanctuary. There are displayed three marble heads: A head of Heracles dated possibly to the 1st century AD, the head of a philosopher of Late Antiquity, dated to the 4th century AD and a head of a priest or philosopher dated to the 2nd century AD. In the past it had been identified as a head of Plutarch. A hermaic stele nearby bears a dedicatory inscription to Plutarch and it probably held a head statue of the ancient author, but the latter has not been preserved.

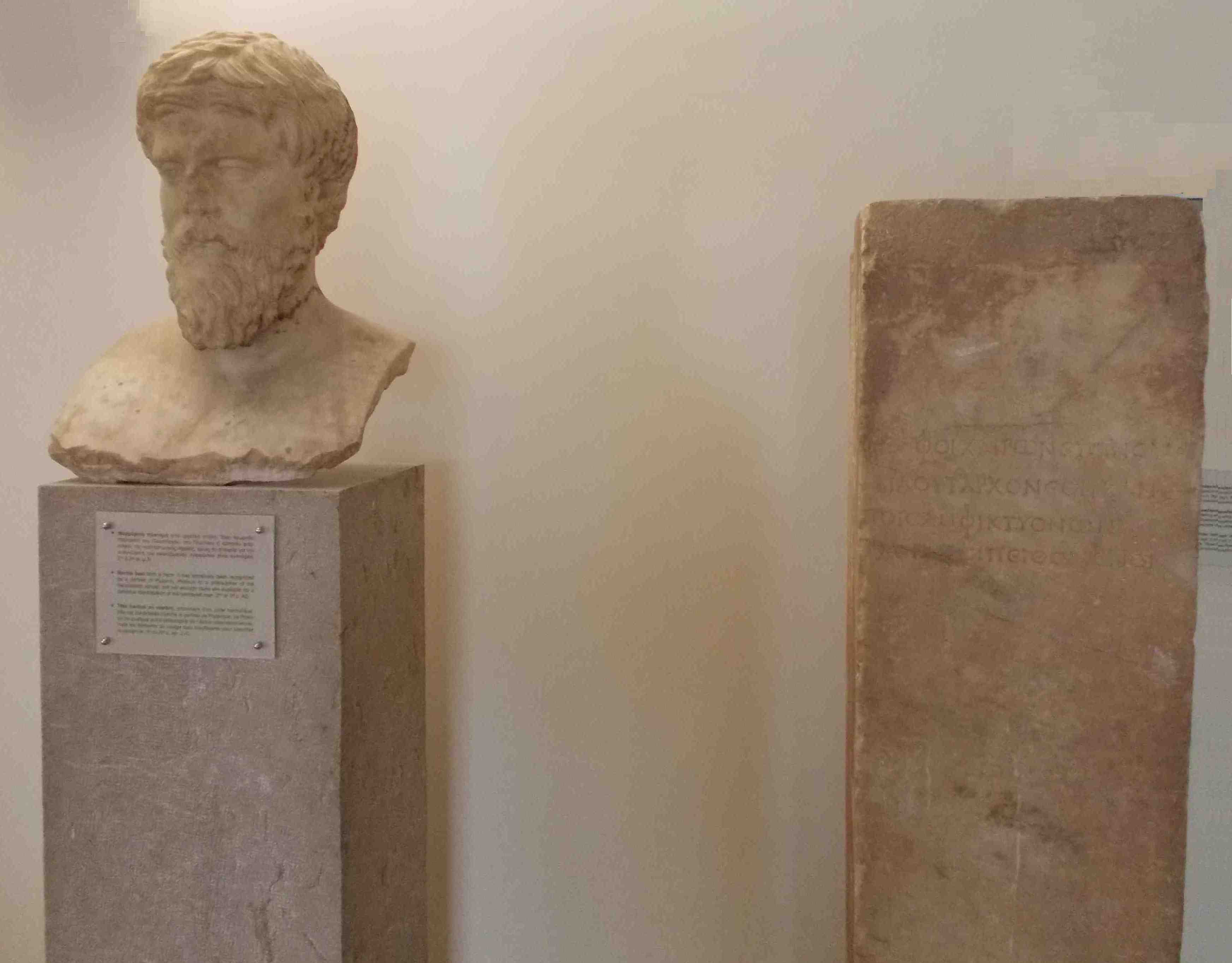
Head of a philosopher, said to be Plutarch (left). Herm of a votive with the bust of Plutarch (right).

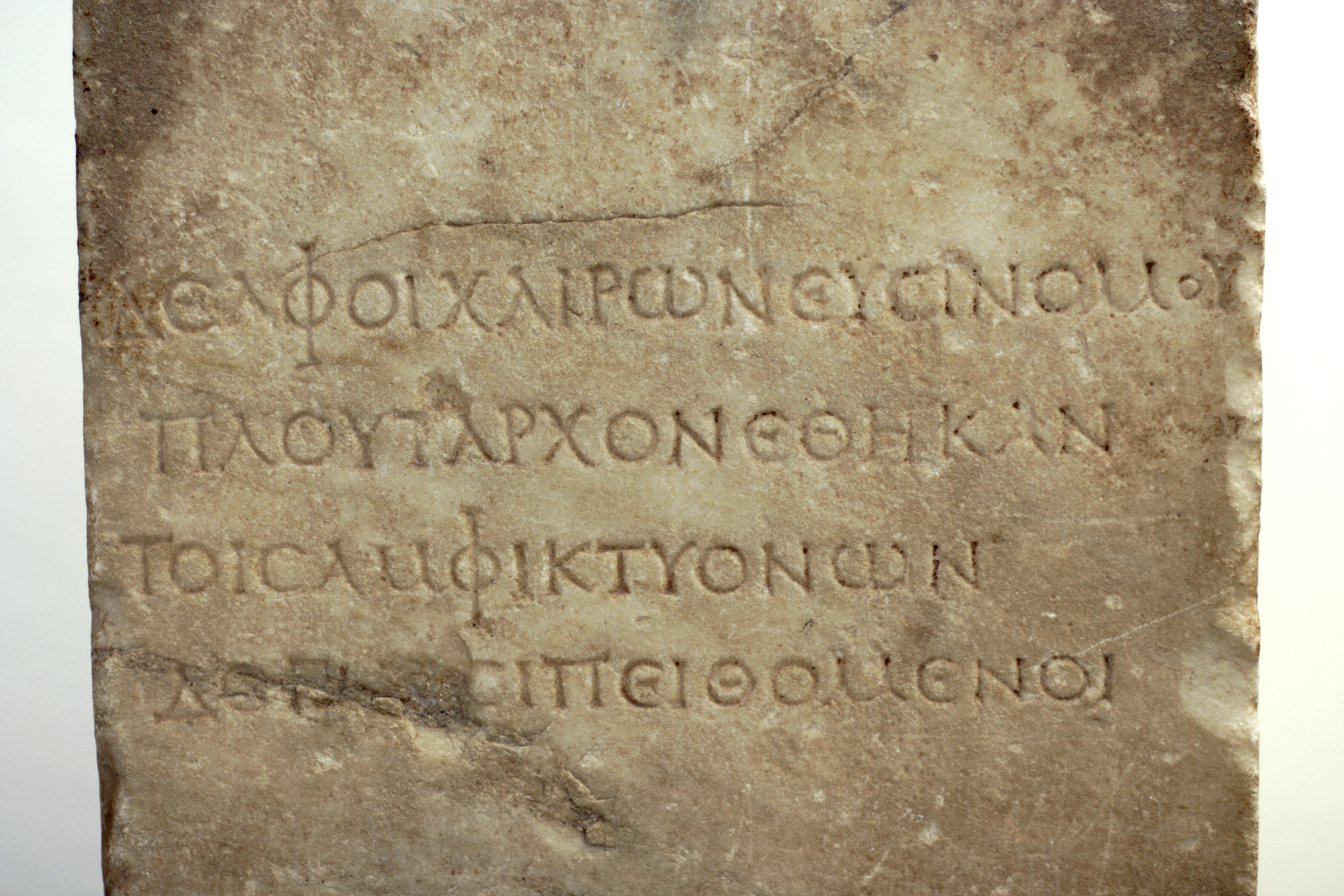
Inscription in the votive stele of Plutarch.

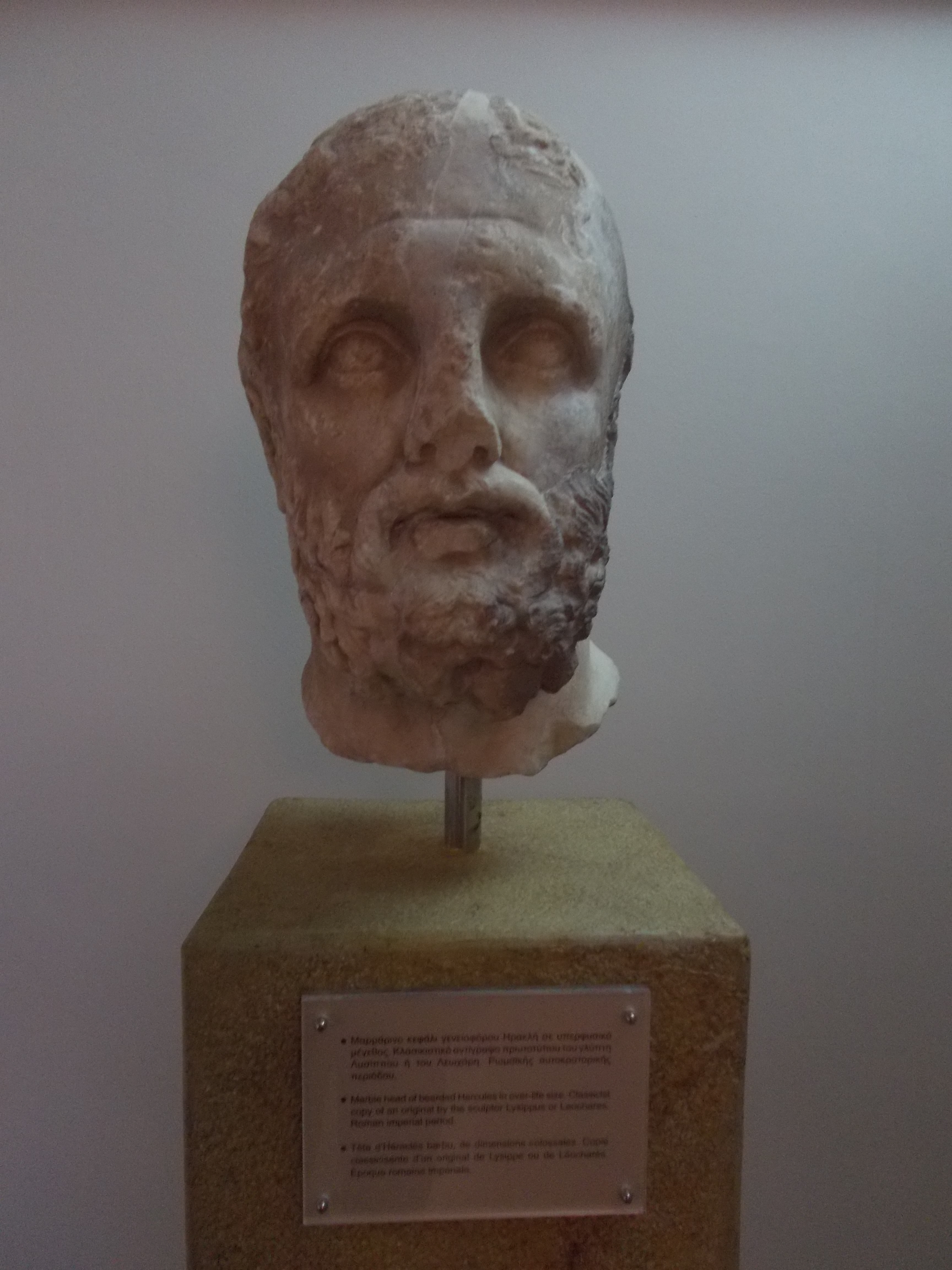
Marble of bearded head said to be Heracles.

== The ground floor gallery ==
The ground floor room contains finds from the necropolis of Delphi, from houses, from the Corycian cave, as well as several other finds of unidentified origin. Three funerary stelae stand right next to the entrance; they bear depictions of the deceased in relief. The first case contains Mycenaean stirrup jars and the next one various types of Mycenaean pottery from the Mycenaean settlement. Hand-made and wheel-made pottery (11th–9th century BCE) are also extant, coming from a chamber tomb discovered at the site of the museum. In the case at the opposite side of the room is displayed pottery, of which stands out a group of pottery from the so-called "Corinthian house" dated to 625–600 BCE. In the next case are displayed seals and scarabs of Egyptian style. In a free standing case in the middle of the room is displayed a bronze hydria with depiction in relief, a rather rare vessel of a workshop located in the north Peloponnese. Burial votive offerings are exhibited in the next case, including belt buckles, aryballoi, and incense bottles. Classical period pottery follows. A large clay bust of Demeter or Persephone along with several other clay vessels come from the so-called "grave of the priest". In the next case are exhibited grave goods from a grave located around the museum, dated to the first half of the 4th century BCE. Two attic lekythoi with depictions in relief, clay figurines of Aphrodite, a dancer, Cassandra, a comic actor as well as a doll with movable hands and legs count among the most important exhibits. The long case along the narrow wall contains finds from the Corycian cave, such as two vessels of the late Neolithic period, some human clay figurines, obsidian blades, and some of the knucklebones discovered there. Some figurines depict korae (young women) and animals. The most impressive exhibit, however, is a chorus of the Muses around Pan. In the rest of the cases are displayed black-figured lekythoi, clay figurines, a rather large figurine of Aphrodite, and a folding mirror decorated with the head of the same goddess. Finally, some Late antique exhibits such as oil-lamps and a leopard made of mother-of-pearl offer a glimpse into the city of Delphi in Late Antiquity.

== See also ==
- List of museums in Greece
