= Chryselephantine statues at Delphi =

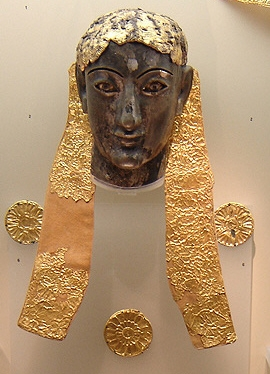
Apollo.

The chryselephantine statues of Apollo, Artemis and Leto occupy a hall in the Delphi Archaeological Museum looking rather like a treasury. They constitute excellent specimens of mid-6th century B.C. art, coming from workshops in Ionia, or, to a certain extent, Corinth.

== History ==
During the excavations at the dump of the Sacred Way, opposite to the Halos, which was accidentally discovered in 1939, there were found several objects which had been buried because they were sacred and thus it was forbidden to sell or transform them. It seems that all these ex-votos in Delphi had been probably destroyed by fire around the mid 5th century B.C. Some of those probably constituted a gold-and-ivory group depicting the Apollonian triad, namely Apollo, Artemis and Leto. The scholars have related these finds to the sumptuous ex-votos of Croesus, king of Lydia, which Herodotus so eloquently describes. This identification is however uncertain; the only certain fact is that the works are magnificent creations of the mid-6th century B.C., coming from workshops in Ionia, or, to a certain extent, Corinth.

== Apollo ==
Apollo bears the distinctive archaic smile. His hair is made of gilded silver, with two broad curls flanking the head and falling on the shoulders made of a single golden leaf. The front part of the feet is discernible, while the rest are covered by the long garment. He probably held in his hand a precious vessel, possibly a shallow bowl (phiale).

== Artemis ==
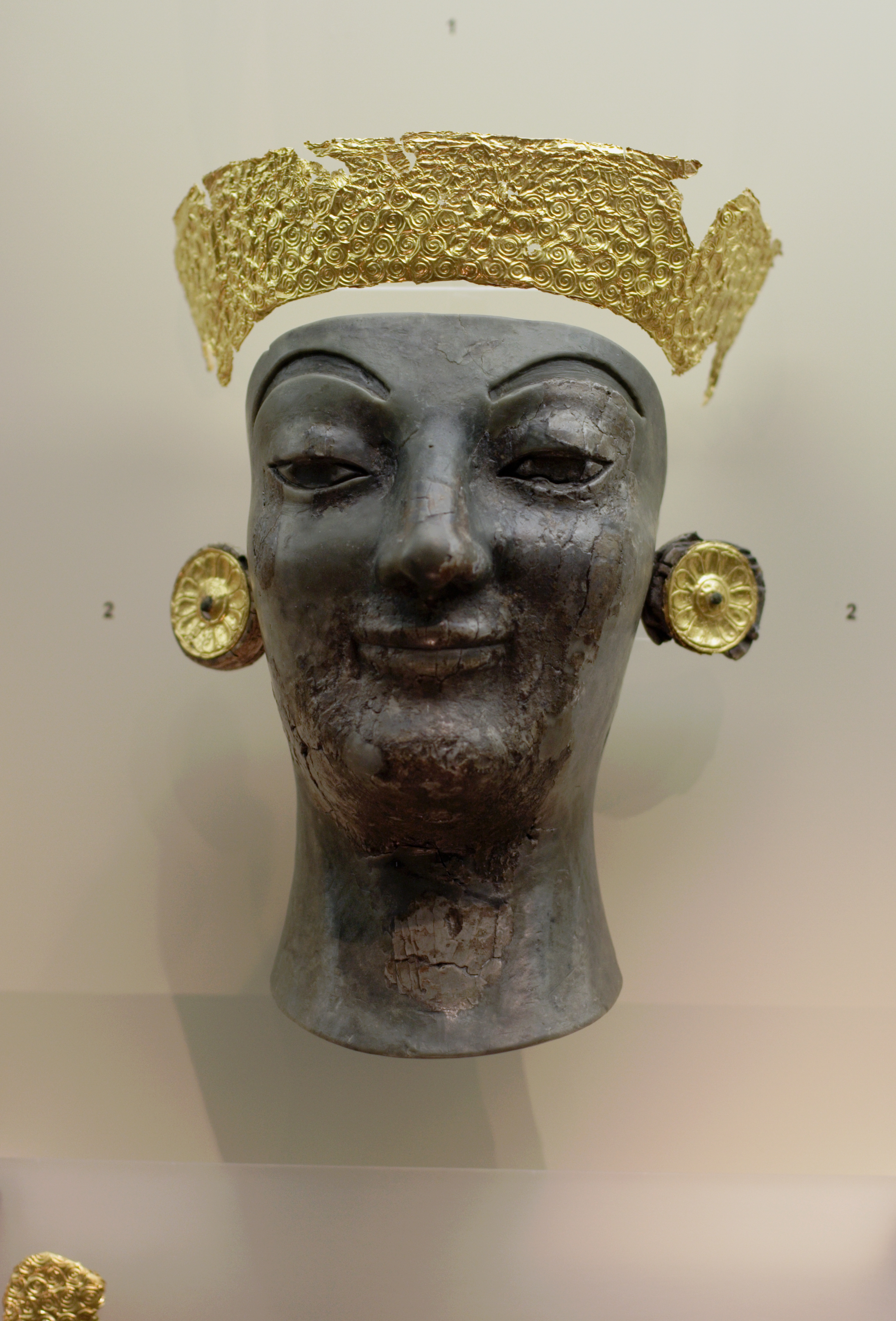
Artemis.

The head attributed to Artemis bears a mild, sweet expression. She wears a golden tiara and rosette-decorated earrings. Her garment was decorated with two large rectangular lamellae of gold, positioned vertically and bearing depictions of existing or mythological animals: a gazelle, a lion, a bull, a deer, a pegasus, a griffin, a sphinx. As in the case of Apollo, her eyes and eyebrows were made with an inlay technique. The artist probably originated from Ionia, possibly from Samos.

== Leto and other figures ==
Apart from the third large head (attributed to Leto, the mother of the two gods) parts of other statues and five smaller ivory heads. Additional decorative elements are preserved, made of gold or ivory, among which stand out tiles with depictions of the Gorgon, Pegasus and a griffin, as well as rosettes, anthemia and floral items. Several decorative elements were probably attached to a wooden substratum, possibly to furniture.

== Sources ==
- Amandry, P.,(1992) Guide de Delphes : le musée, Paris
- Kolonia, R.,(2006) The Archaeological Museum of Delphi, Athens
