= Halos (Delphi) =

The Halos was a round open space close to the temple of Apollo in Delphi, where ancient rituals were being performed.

== Description ==
Between the Bouleuterion and Sibyl's Rock in the sanctuary of Apollo in Delphi there is a narrow pass leading to the fountain which the dragon Python was supposedly guarding. Apollo killed the dragon and then left for the land of the Hyperboreans in order to be expiated from the murder. This action signifies in mythology the transition from the early chthonic cults to the cult of the god of light and music. At that spot, in front of the rocks marking the pass, a round square is formed, called Halos (literally: a threshing floor), where several rituals were taking place. Among these rituals was the Septerion (Σεπτήριον), the ritual re-enactment of the murder of Python by Apollo, taking place once every eight years. Plutarch mentions that during the ritual cleansing of the site a boy, whose parent were both alive, would set fire on a wooden construction symbolizing the dwelling of Python and then went on to cleanse himself as Apollo had done, taking recourse initially in the Tempi Valley. Around the Halos, particularly on its north side, platforms and bases for monuments were erected, particularly in the Hellenistic period. Among them stands out the base for a statue of the Pergamene king Attalus II Philadelphus(159-138 B.C.), dedicated by the city of Delphi. To the northeast the Halos is delimited by the Polygonal wall, built after the destruction of the Temple of Apollo (Delphi) in 548 B.C., in order to support the ground for the erection of the new temple that was going to be built under the auspices of the Alcmaeonids. To the north of the Halos stood the Portico of the Athenians, also lying against the Polygonal wall. In 1939, in the course of repair works along the Sacred Way, a repository was discovered in front of the Halos, in which a large number of ex votos and other liturgical objects was discovered. These ex votos had been destroyed at a prior phase, by fire or other causes, and, according to the practice in those days, they were buried because it was forbidden to recycle or sell them. The most important of these finds were the chryselephantine statues of Apollo and Artemis and a silver bull.
