= Temple of Apollo (Delphi) =

Ancient Greek temple

Temple of Apollo at Delphi
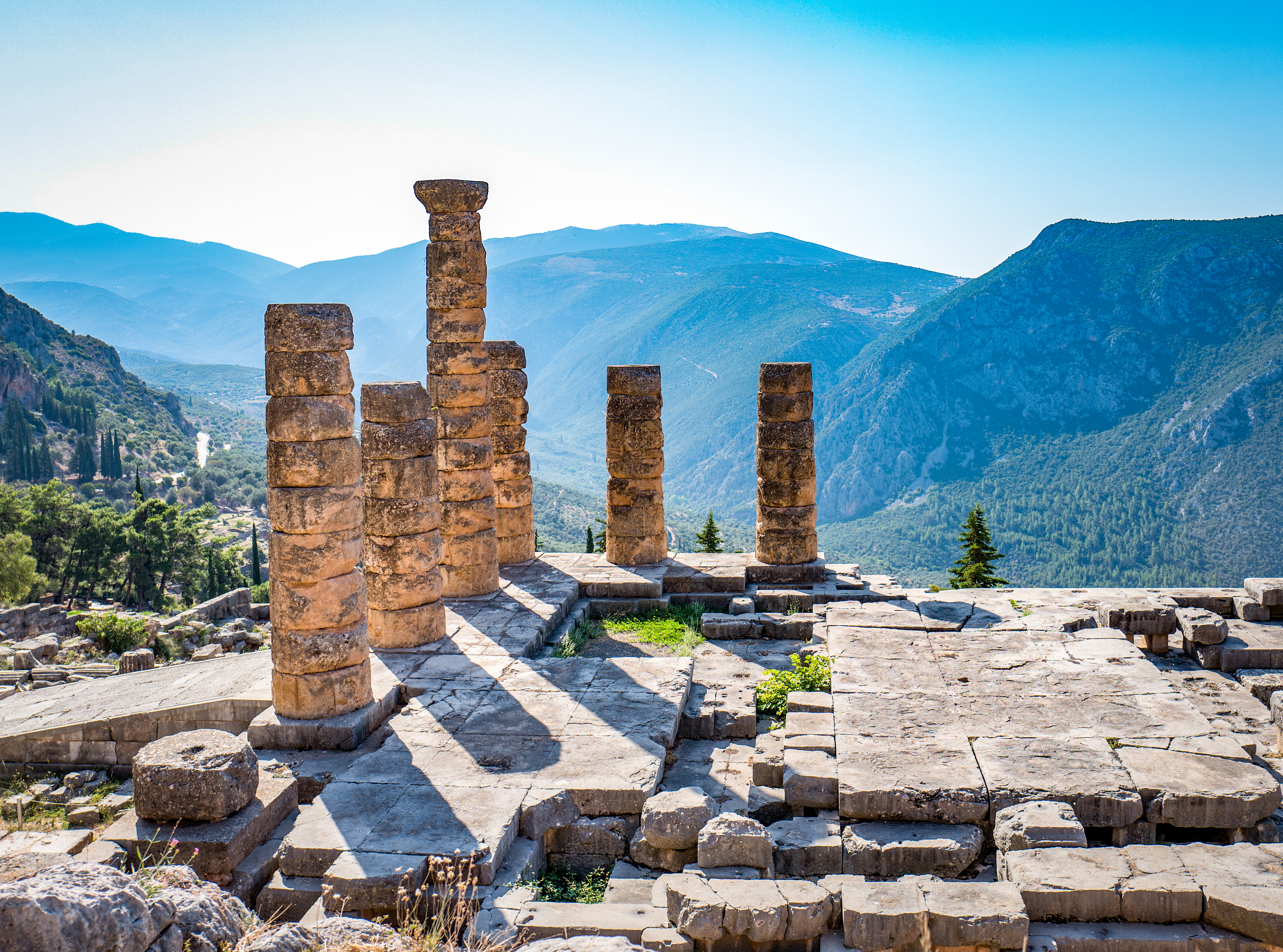

Religion
- Affiliation: Hellenism
- Deity: Apollo

Location
- Location: Delphi
- Interactive map of Temple of Apollo at Delphi
- Coordinates: 38°28′56″N 22°30′04″E

Architecture
- Architects: Spintharus of Corinth; Xenodoros; Agathon

The Temple of Apollo, also known as Apollonion, (Greek: Ἀπολλώνιον, romanized: Apollṓnion) was a major part of the Panhellenic religious sanctuary located in Central Greece at Delphi. The temple and sanctuary at large were dedicated to one of the major Greek deities, Apollo, the god of archery, music, light, prophecy, the arts, and healing. There have been several temples built at Delphi throughout the history of the site, though the visible ruins seen in modernity are those of the temple built in the 4th century B.C.E. before its destruction under the orders of Theodosius I in 390 C.E. During antiquity, the temple was home to the famous Greek prophetess the Pythia, or the Oracle of Delphi, making the Temple of Apollo and the sanctuary at Delphi a major Panhellenic religious site as early as the 8th century B.C.E., and a place of great importance at many different periods of ancient Greek history. References to Delphi, the sanctuary, the temple, and the prophecies of the Pythia are made throughout ancient Greek mythology and historical accounts from the periods of its use.

== Location ==
Located on Mount Parnassus in Central Greece, the Temple of Apollo at Delphi is part of the Panhellenic Sanctuary at Delphi and occupies a remote, but central location relative to other Greek cities and settlements. The area is historically a major economic site due to the extensive olive groves nearby, as well as a major religious site between the associations with Dionysus and his Dionysian mysteries and Delphi being situated among the southern slopes in a valley north of the Gulf of Corinth. The Temple of Apollo at Delphi was situated within a central area of the sanctuary, surrounded by the Theater, other sanctuaries to Gaia, Dionysus, and Neoptolemus, treasuries housing the offerings dedicated by major Greek polis', and several other statues, stoa, and altars. Beginning at the Castalian Spring where visitors to the sanctuary would purify themselves before entering, the path leading to the Temple of Apollo was referred to as the Sacred Way and was lined with treasuries housing the offerings of different major Greek states, like Athens, Corinth, Boeotia, and Thebes among many others. Within the ancient Greek world, Delphi was considered the center of the universe, marked by the omphalos, or "navel", of the Earth that was located in Apollo's sacred temple. The Temple of Apollo at Delphi was perceived as an incredibly sacred site, considered a major center of ancient Greek religious practice and belief as well as a place intimately connected to the gods.

== Architecture ==
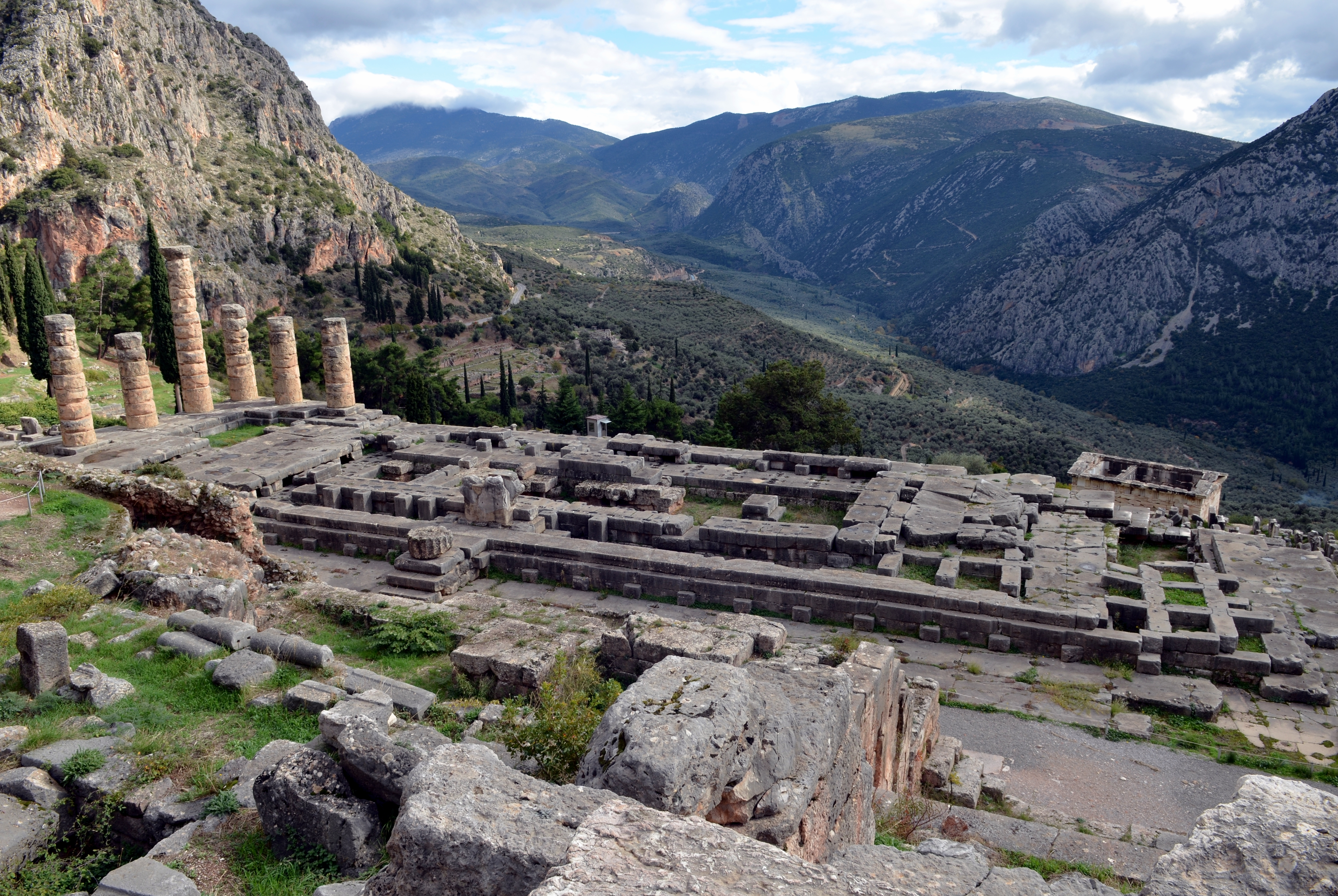
The ruins of the Temple of Apollo at Delphi in 2012.

=== The First Four Temples ===
Greek traditions and writing reference five different temples built at Delphi throughout history. Scholars like Henry J. Middleton have argued that the first three temples were constructed before the creation of the Homeric poems and before the cult of Apollo was established at Delphi. The first temple at Delphi took the form of a hut made from laurel from the Vale of Tempe, the sacred tree and major religious symbol of Apollo. The second temple was a gift from Apollo to the Hyperboreans, either constructed using beeswax and feathers or by a Delphian named Pteras using ferns, though Pausanias denies the latter. Within myth, the third temple was said to be made of bronze and built by Hephaestus, though in his writing Pausanias expressed his doubts about Hephaestus' role in its construction. Pausanias also provides two possibilities for the destruction of the third temple, either having been burned down by fire or falling into a deep fissure of the earth. While the Homeric Hymn to Apollo states that Apollo himself laid the foundations, Pausanias states that the fourth temple was one of stone built by Trophonius and Agamedes before it was burned down in 548 B.C.E. Arguments by historians have been made that the fourth temple was the first sanctuary during the time of Apollo at Delphi, and the temple is referred to in most Greek mythological tradition when talking about Delphi and Apollo's patronage of the city.

=== The Fifth Temple ===
The fifth temple was originally built around the end of the 6th century B.C.E, though it was eventually reconstructed after an earthquake in 330 B.C.E. Except for some external sculptures that were completed in the later half of the 5th century B.C.E., the temple was fully functioning by 490 B.C.E. as they were mentioned in one of Pindar's Pythian odes. The original fifth temple was of the Doric order with a six-by-fifteen column peristyle on the exterior. The Amphictyonic league council, the religious and later political order that controlled Delphi, held a meeting before the construction of the new temple and decided the cost of building the new temple would be split. The original budget set was at 300 talents, and a decision was made that a quarter of the payment would be made by the people of Delphi while the rest was to be collected via donations from other civilizations within the known world, though several donations well exceeded that budget such as the Greek colonists of Naucratis having given twenty mina (unit) or the Egyptian King Amasis II giving 1,000 talents.

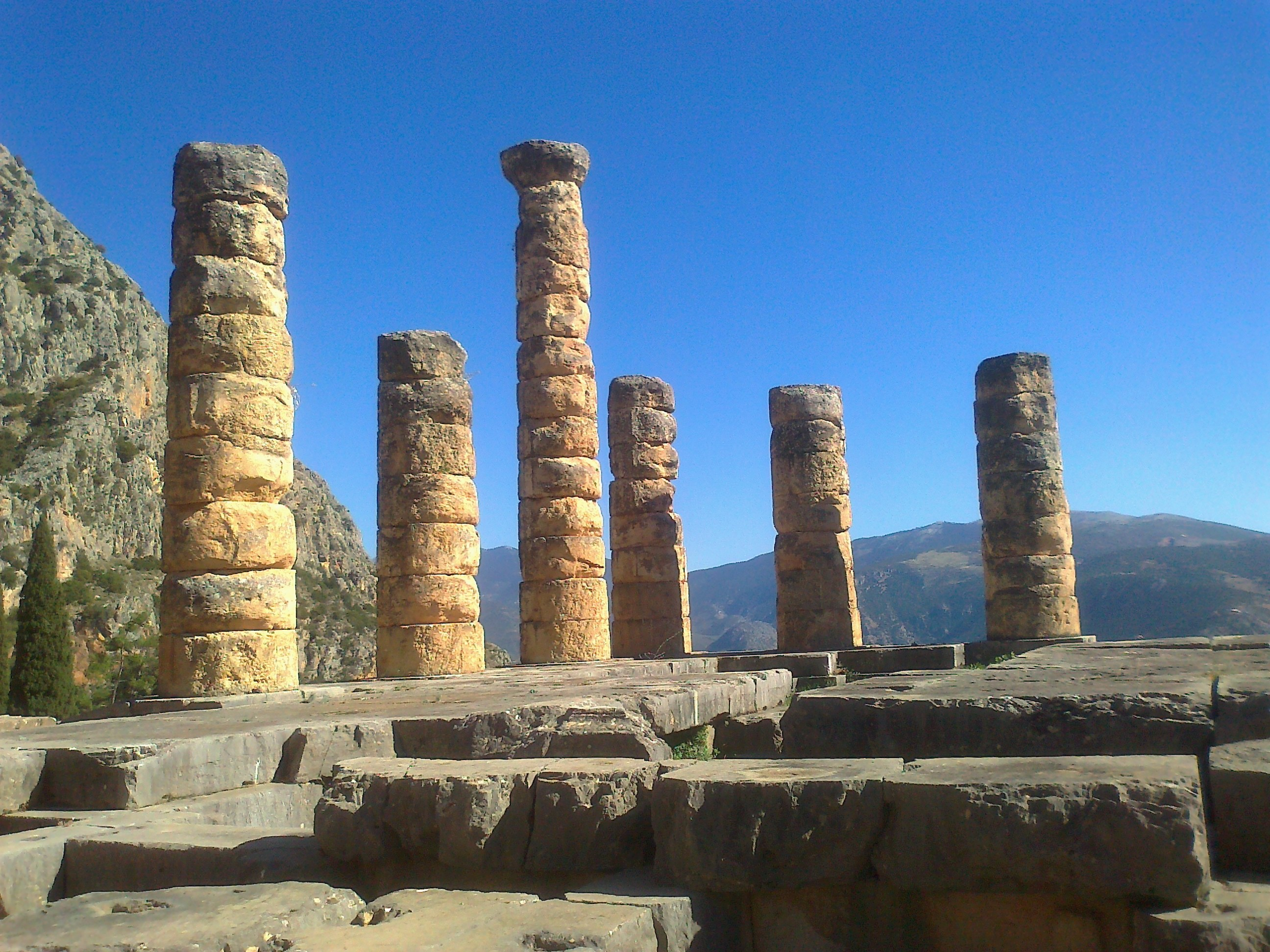
Doric columns on the temple's south-east corner.

==== The Exterior ====
Several ancient sources refer to the magnificence of the temple, such as several of Pindar's Pythian victory odes and Euripides' Ion. Herodotus also makes claims that the beauty of the temple is accredited to the wealth and good lineage of the Alcmaeonidae family that handled the contract given to them by the Amphictyonic league. Alongside designating Spintharius of Corinth as the architect, the contract regarding the design of the temple said it was to be made of limestone, though there is a reference that the unexpected increase of the budget allowed for the inclusion of white Parian marble columns. Decorating the exterior of the temple were pediments started by the sculptor Praxias but finished by Androsthenes after the Praxias' death. The pediments occupied the Eastern and Western sides of the temple, with the Eastern pediment including imagery of Apollo, Artemis, and Leto standing along a rising and setting sun while the Western pediment depicted Dionysus among his female votaries, the Thyiades. The exterior of the temple was also decorated with metopes, with five major depictions of gods and heroes being victorious over monsters, a mirroring of Apollo's defeat of Python during the mythological founding of the Temple of Apollo at Delphi. They included Heracles and Iolaus defeating the Lernaean Hydra, Bellerophon and the Pegasus defeating the Chimera, Zeus defeating the giant Mimas, Athena defeating the giant Enceladus, and Dionysus killing a giant with his thyrsus, all of which would have been outfitted with weapons, shields, and accessories of gilt bronze. Also attached to the temple's exterior were Persian shields taken as spoils of war by the Athenians from the Battle of Marathon in 490 B.C.E. and Gallic shields from the repulsion of the Gauls during a 279 B.C.E. invasion. Other major architectural aspects of the exterior of the temple include the Sphinx of Naxos, built around 560 B.C.E. and which sits on a tall column guarding the sanctuary. The temple itself was built on a platform situated on a sloped hill with a North to South incline, with evidence of rows with small, stone chambers underneath, all of which were encompassed by large walls made up of polygonal masonry. These walls have inscriptions relating to Amphictyonic council degrees granting special privileges, public eulogies to benefactors, the Pythian Games, and the emancipation of slaves upon their dedication to Apollo, among other major declarations, with some dating as far back as the 3rd century B.C.E. while others to Roman times under Hadrian.

==== The Interior ====
The exact layout of the interior of the temple is unknown, though several Greek writers from different periods make several references to significant offerings or notable architectural points of the temple, such as the pronaos, the cella, the inner sanctuary, and vault or chamber where the Pythia would receive prophecies. According to writers from antiquity, inscribed on a column in the pronaos, the porch before the temple's cella, were three of the Delphic maxims of the Seven Sages: ΓΝΩΘΙ ΣΑΥΤΟΝ (KNOW THYSELF), ΜΗΔΕΝ ΑΓΑΝ (NOTHING IN EXCESS), and ΕΓΓΥΑ, ΠΑΡΑ ΔΑΤΗ (SURETY BRINGS RUIN) as well as the enigmatic Delphic symbol “Ε”. The main cella of the temple was the place where travelers or pilgrims looking to consult the Pythia would wait for a response. The floor of the cella was made of blue-grey limestone slabs that were occasionally washed with water from the Castilian spring, while the walls were decorated with paintings Pliny the Elder accredits to Aristoclides. Following the main cella was the inner sanctuary, or adyton, of the temple, restricted to priests of Apollo. Although the dating for when specific objects would have been within the adyton, at one point or another it would have likely housed a golden statue of Apollo, the Omphalos, sacred armor considered unlawful for mortals to touch, and an altar with a pine-wood fire where the Pythia would have likely burnt bay-leave and barley-meal. Some objects or statues that Pindar mentions as being in the temple are a hearth, two statues of Zeus and Apollo in association with prophecy and the Fates, the stone given to Chronos by Rhea in place of infant Zeus, and an iron chair dedicated to Pindar upon which he would have sung and composed odes to Apollo. The final major point of the Temple of Apollo at Delphi is the oracular vault which the Pythia would have gone into, to receive a prophecy, likely positioned under the temple itself and housing the tripod the Pythia would have sat on.

The temple survived until AD 390, when the Roman emperor Theodosius I issued an order for the destruction of pagan temples and iconography, thus ordering the destruction of the Temple of Apollo at Delphi and the removal or destruction of most of the statues and artwork, leaving few remains.

== Historic use ==
=== Worship of Apollo and Dionysus ===
The Temple of Apollo at Delphi functioned as a Panhellenic sanctuary serving all Greek settlements, though Apollo was not the only deity worshiped at the temple. For nine months out of the year the cult of Apollo would be the dominant sect within the temple at Delphi, then during the winter months oracular practice is paused, and focus shifts to the cult of Dionysus as the Thyiades staged festivals and rituals to honor the god. As the cult of Dionysus was largely a mystery cult, these practices are not entirely well known, though they reference the reincarnation of Dionysus from a mortal into a god and the temple at Delphi housing the mortal remains of Dionysus. Outside of the winter months, ritual practice at the Temple of Apollo at Delphi would largely focus on Apollo and the Pythia.

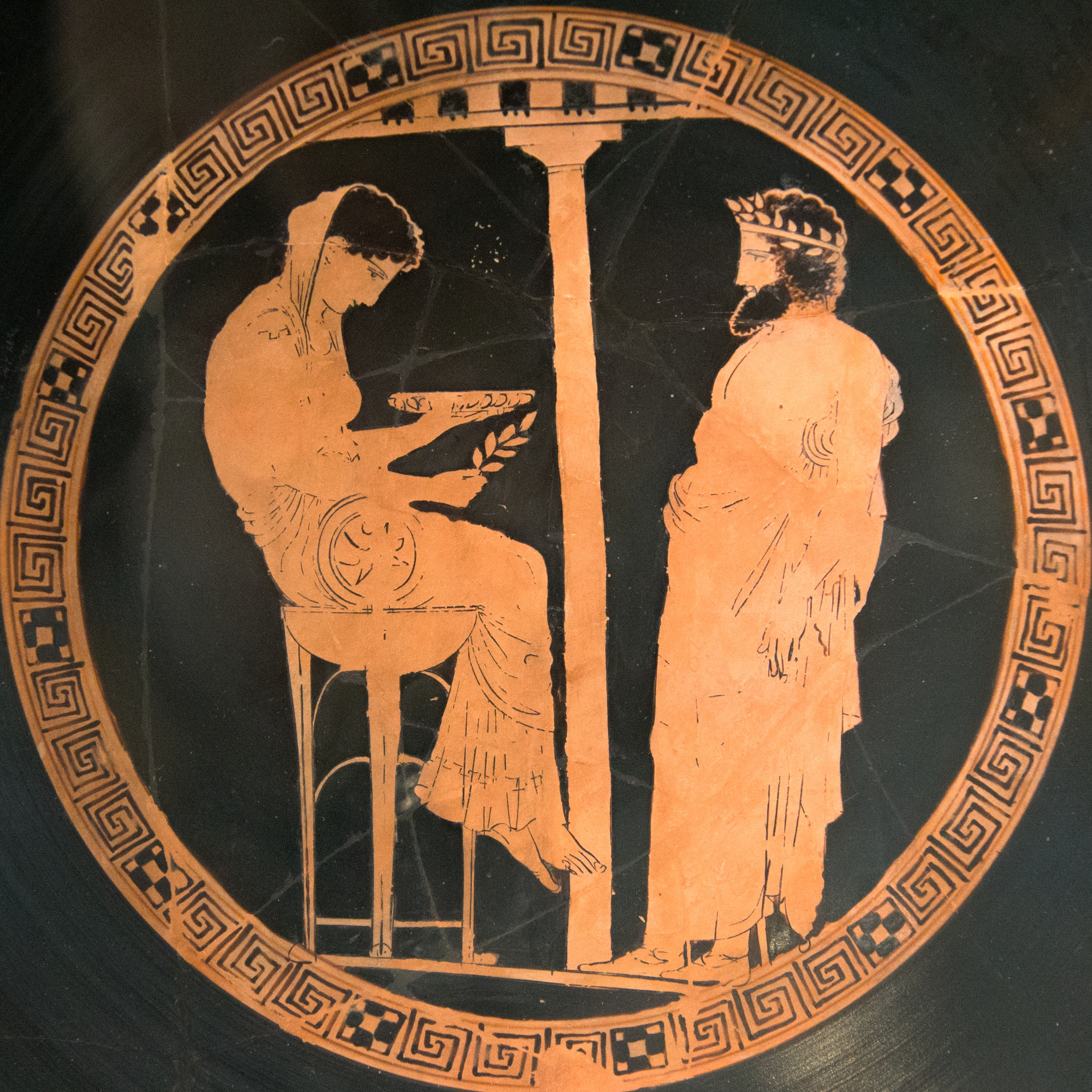
The Pythia and King Aegeus (Attic kylix, 440-430 BCE)

=== Prophecy and The Pythia ===
The priestesses of Apollo, known as the Pythia, served as the oracle for the Temple of Apollo at Delphi. Greeks and non-Greeks alike would go to the Temple of Apollo at Delphi from across the Mediterranean and beyond to consult the Pythia on a variety of different topics, ranging from the state level like the establishment of new colonies to the personal level like marriage, children, and health. The Pythia was typically regarded as the foremost oracle within the Greek world, with Herodotus making emphasis on this claim when recounting the story of the Lydian king Croesus. However, prophecies throughout Greek history and mythology were notably vague, and misinterpretation of prophesies would remain a major theme across historical accounts, literature, and myth. Famous examples of these' misunderstandings include Croesus incorrectly assuming he would win and defeat the Achaemenid Empire when told that a great empire will fall if he went to war with the Persians and Oedipus incorrectly assuming the prophecy from Pythia was about his adopted parents from Corinth in Oedipus Rex.

The women selected to be the Pythia were originally selected among the women of Delphi. This was supposedly changed when one of the Pythia were violated by Echecrates the Thessalian when he came to Delphi for a prophecy, and following this future priestess were required to be at least fifty years old though they intentionally dressed like a young woman.

The oracular process of the Pythia is not entirely well known nor without debate, though there are ancient accounts of several different aspects of the process. The inquirer came to the Temple of Apollo at Delphi and offered a gift upon the altar located outside the building, typically sacrificial animals such as goats, sheep, or bulls. If the Pythia decided an offering was sufficient, she would proceed to enter Apollo's temple and descend into a chamber below the sanctuary ground. She would then sit on a tripod in the chamber and be cleansed by water from the Castalian spring, which is said to have entered the chamber through a large chasm in the rock floor. Various accounts describe the emission of gases also arising from the chasm while others say burnt bay laurel leaves created the fumes. Reports also state the Pythia inhaled the gases or fumes, drank from a silver bowl containing water from the Castalian spring, and held a branch of the bay laurel plant in her hand and in doing so brought to a state of delirium. In this tranced psychological state came the knowledge of Apollo which the Pythia would begin to voice in words that could not be understood. A priest standing above in the temple hears her voice through an opening in the floor and interprets the prophecy, which was then delivered either verbally to the inquirer or, often in more important cases, written by the priest on a bay laurel leaf. This interpretation has been challenged by some scholars, such as Joseph Fontenrose and Lisa Maurizio, who argue that the ancient sources uniformly represent the Pythia speaking intelligibly, and giving prophecies in her voice.

The legitimacy of the oracular process which took place at the Temple of Apollo has been a topic of much debate among modern scholars. Research on this topic does not seem to suggest any evidence of a large fissure or chasm in the ground under the temple, nor any indication that consuming bay laurel leaves or water from the Castalian spring can induce an intoxicated state.

=== Healing ===
While prophecy and the consultation of the oracle were major aspects of religious practice at Delphi, Apollo was likely also worshiped for his capacity as a healer. Inscriptions along the polygonal wall refer to a tax levied to pay for medical attendance for people coming to the temple for healing. Capable of inflicting and relieving civilizations of plague, the Temple of Apollo at Delphi was also visited when seeking Apollo's help during large health disasters.

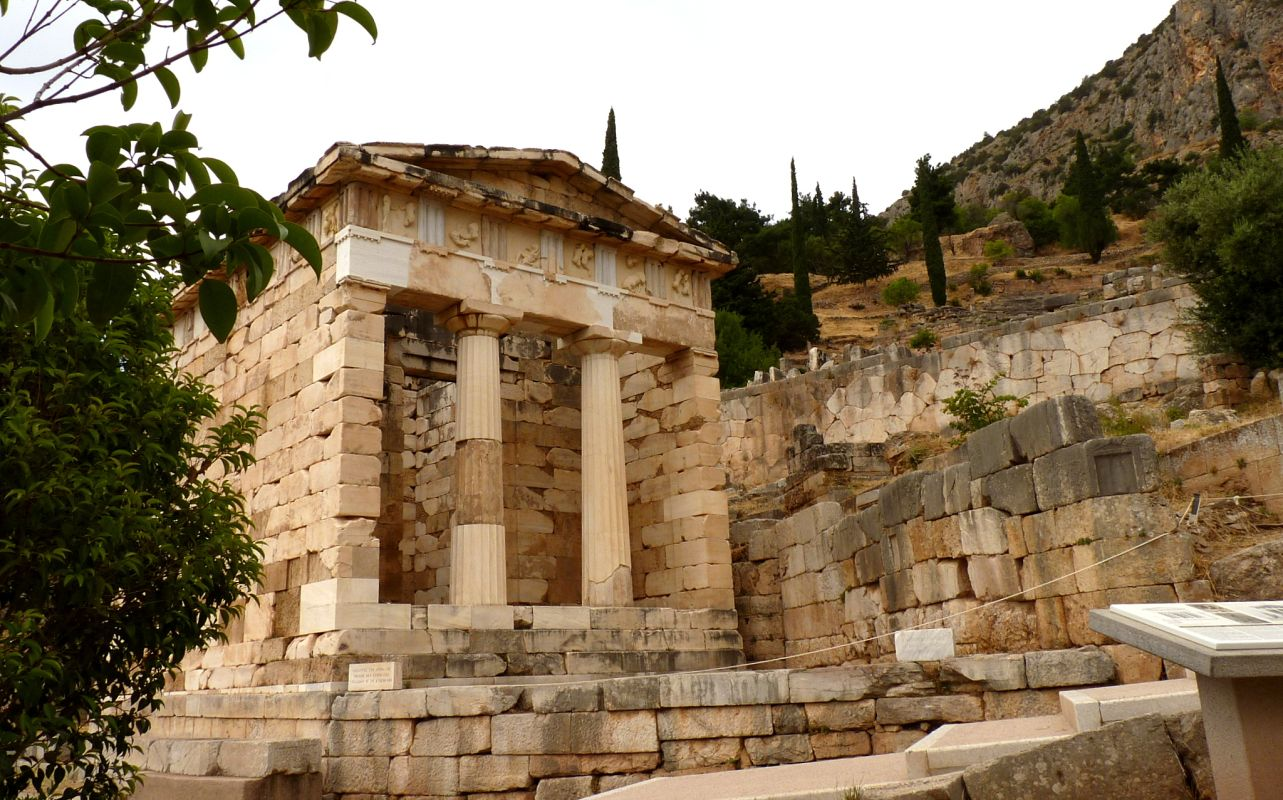
Treasury of Athens situated along the Sacred Way leading to the Temple of Apollo at Delphi.

=== Offerings ===
The offering of sacrificial animals and material goods to the gods were major ritualistic practices in Ancient Greek religion, especially in the form of votive offering. Several ancient writers make reference to major offerings from individuals or states that would have been stored at the temple or the nearby treasuries within the sanctuary. Their exact placement within the temple is unclear and in some cases inconsistent with other authors, though some are more specific in their origins and objects offered. A detailed example of this includes the wealth that Croesus, King of Lydia, dedicated to the temple before the Greco-Persian Wars and his loss to Xerxes I or the silver bowl and its iron stand made by Glaucus of Chios and dedicated by Alyattes, father of Croesus, both of which Herodotus mentioned in his Histories. The offerings that accumulated at the temple and the treasuries within the sanctuary made Delphi an incredibly wealthy city, a wealth that was so renown that Herodotus made remarks that Xerxes I would have been more familiar with the Delphic wealth than his own in Persia.

=== The Sacred Wars ===
At several different points during the period of 595 B.C.E. and 290 B.C.E., the city of Delphi became a place of major contention with multiple parties vying for control of the city, resulting in a series of Sacred Wars, several of which saw the looting of the treasuries and the Temple of Apollo at Delphi. While sometimes including the same states, the wars were not directly connected to or continuations of prior conflicts, and are typically used to refer to instances when multiple parties vied for control of Delphi. Several of the Sacred Wars saw the transitioning of control over Delphi and its religious sites, such as the conflict between Sparta and the Athenian-backed Phocians during the Second Sacred War that saw Sparta return autonomy to the Delphians before Athens returned control to the Phocians. Notably, the Third Sacred War in 357 B.C.E. saw the seizing and looting of the Temple of Apollo by the Phocians after they refused to pay a fine levied by the Amphictyonic League for cultivating sacred land, goods that were then used to fund a mercenary army for the Phocians. At this point, the accumulation of treasures donated or sacrificed to Apollo was sizable, and it is estimated that the Phocians were able to spend 10,000 talents because of the looted Temple.

== Mythology ==
The Delphic oracle and the site of Delphi are heavily referenced across Greek myth and drama, both indirectly and directly. The mythological origins of the Temple of Apollo at Delphi can be found in the second part of the Hymn to Apollo which recounts Pythian Apollo's journey to the site of Delphi. According to Homer, Apollo traveled to the site of Delphi and laid out the foundations for the temple where Trophonius and Agamedes placed a threshold stone for the temple. Upon establishing the sanctuary Apollo traveled to a nearby stream and slayed the she-dragon Python and left her body out to rot, the etymological connections between the Greek word 'to' rot' and Python and Pythian. The slaying of Python connects to the banishment of Apollo by Zeus to Thessaly for the purification of miasma and the mythological origins of the Pythian Games at Delphi.

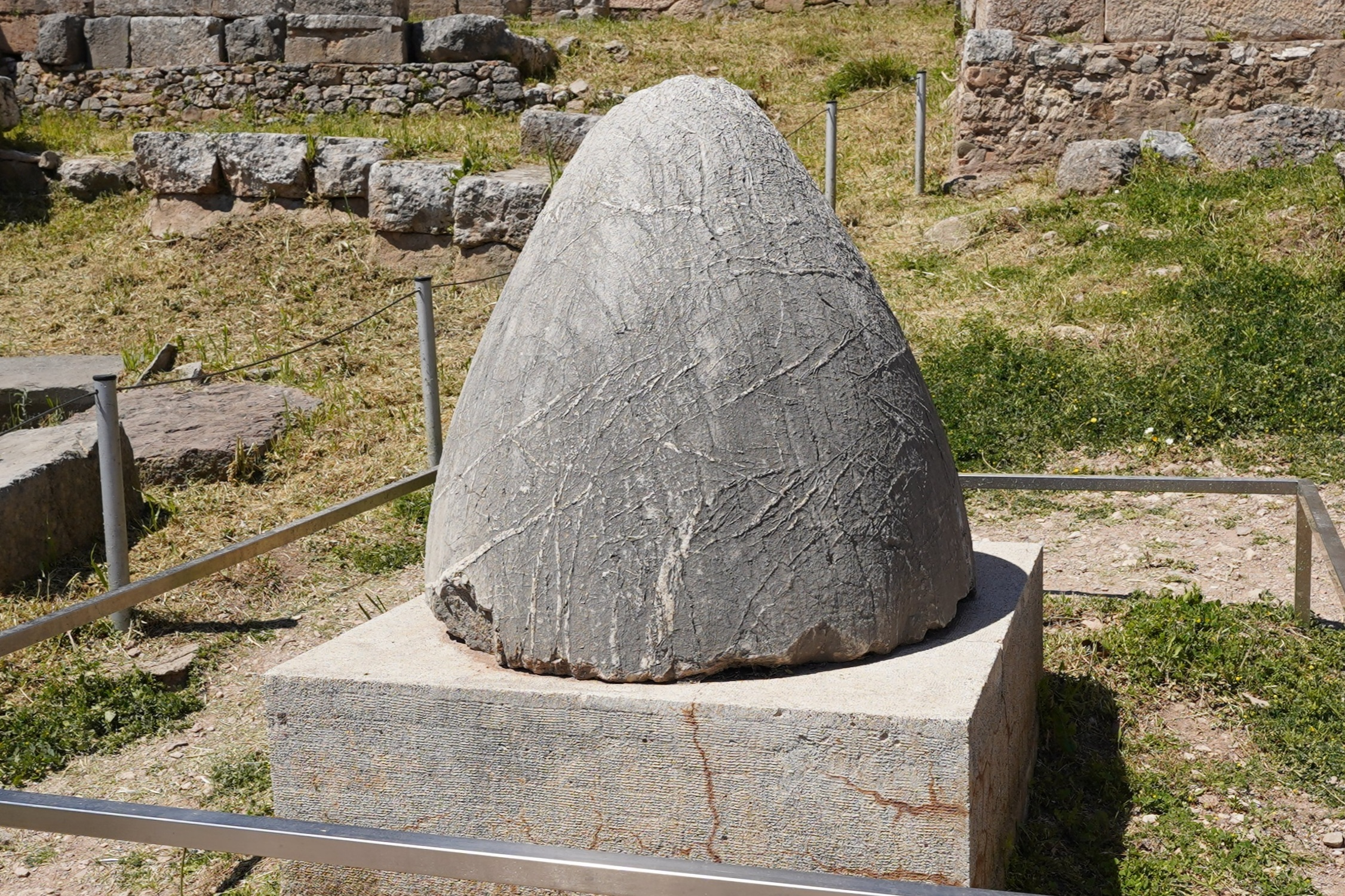
Omphalos at the Temple of Apollo at Delphi.

Following the establishment of the sanctuary and temple, Apollo then intercepted Minoan sailors from Knossos on their way to Pylos intending to make them priest at Delphi. In doing so, Apollo took the form of a dolphin, boarded the ship, and the sailors were awed into fearful submission to the deity. A divine wind guided the ship across the sea and to Crissa, where Apollo revealed himself to the sailors, commanded them to worship him, and guided them to Delphi where he promptly put them in charge of the sanctuary.

Other myths in the Greek world related to Delphi reference it as the center of the universe, marked by the Omphalos stone that was presented as the navel of the Earth and universe. One version of the myth references Zeus released two eagles to fly in opposite directions toward the ends of the Earth before meeting at the site of Delphi, thus marking it as the center of the universe. The omphalos within the temple likely was adorned with two golden eagles at its side in reference to this myth.

== Modern excavation ==
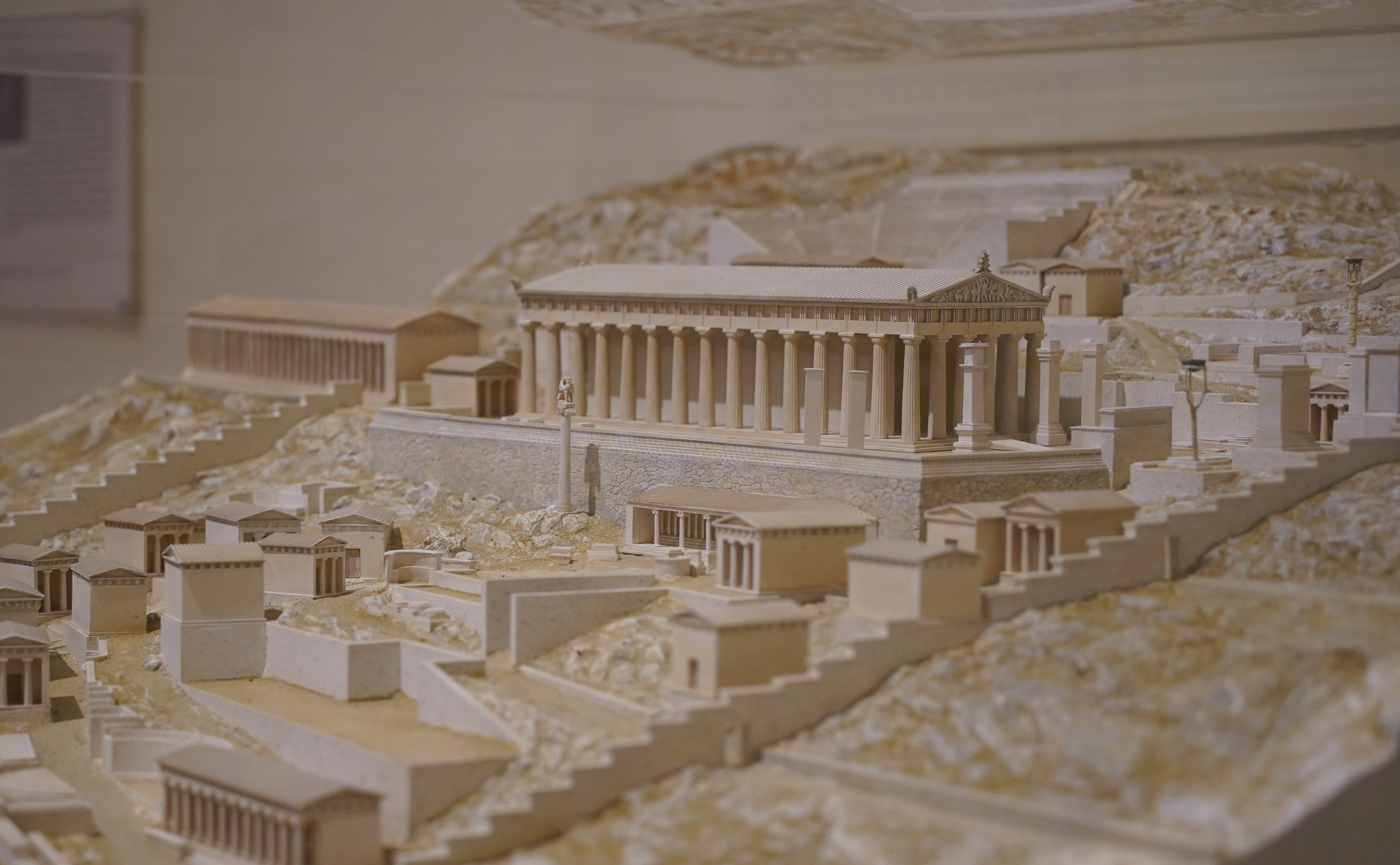
A model reconstruction of the Temple of Apollo at Delphi at the Delphi Archaeological Museum.

The first modern excavation at Delphi took place in 1892. In 1891, the French government granted the French School of Athens the rights to excavate, and the process went from 1892 to 1894. Archaeologist Jean Théphille Homelle led the excavation of the entire site of Delphi, which included the Temple of Apollo. Excavation uncovered various artistic votives dedicated to Apollo. Offerings included buildings, statues, and bronze and marble structures. Most notable amongst the findings was a bronze statue known as the Charioteer of Delphi, a sculpture from a larger bronze structure and the remaining component of the arrangement. According to the Delphi Archaeological Museum, The Charioteer was a gift from Polyzalos of Gela, dedicated to the site after a victorious trip to the Pythian Games. Another important discovery during excavation at the Temple of Apollo was a sculpture depicting three women known as the "Dancers of Delphi," which accompanies the Charioteer in the Delphi Archaeological Museum. The head of the Sphinx of Naxos, also a part of the museum, was found in 1893.

In 1938, the French School of Athens would excavate again under the direction of archaeologist Robert Demangel and supervised by future secretary of the school, Pierre Amandry, and archaeologist, Pierre de La Coste-Messeliére. French excavators discovered two small cavities in the ground below Apollo's sacred temple where they found pieces of ivory, bronze, and gold that were likely the remains of Chryselephantine sculpture depicting humanoid figures. Remains of the statues were preserved well and work began to reconstruct the aesthetics of the statue features. Also found amongst the remains below the Temple of Apollo were gold slates with depictions of animals and mythological figures.

More recent geological study of the Temple of Apollo at Delphi have identified fractures and fault zones in the ground below the site. During a tectonic event, it is possible hydrocarbon gases were emitted from these fault zones and such gases can have intoxicating and psychoactive effects. Geological evidence also indicates that fractures below the temple have created possible passage for Castalian spring water to enter the temple. These geological discoveries may be the origins of accounts about the Pythia and the state of delirium they endured when delivering oracular prophecies.

== Gallery ==
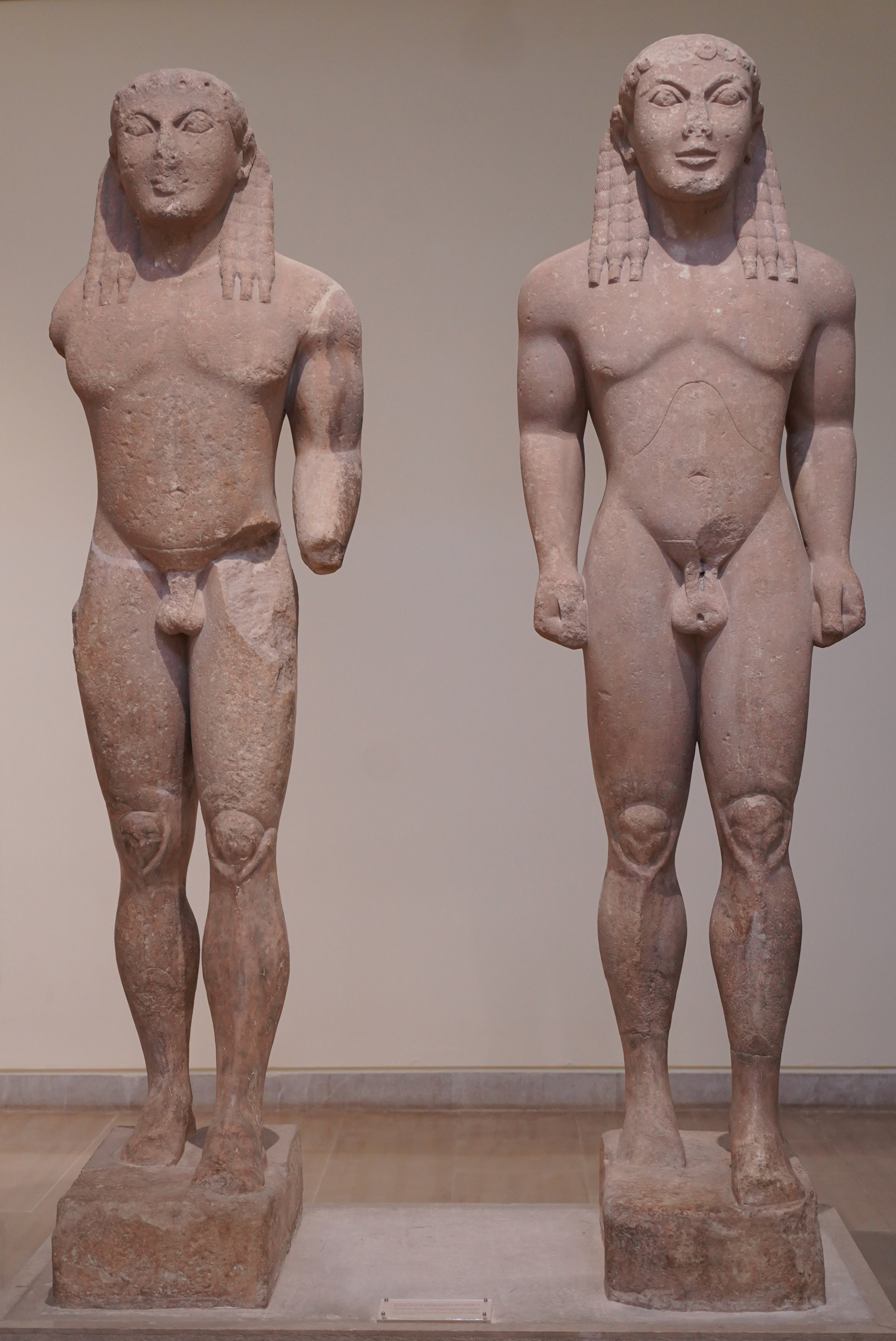
Statues of brothers Kleobis and Biton of Argos, sons of a priestess of Hera. Made by Polymedes of Argos and dedicated to Apollo by the people of Argos. Delphi, Greece. Archaic, 610 B.C.E. Delphi Archaeological Museum, Delphi.

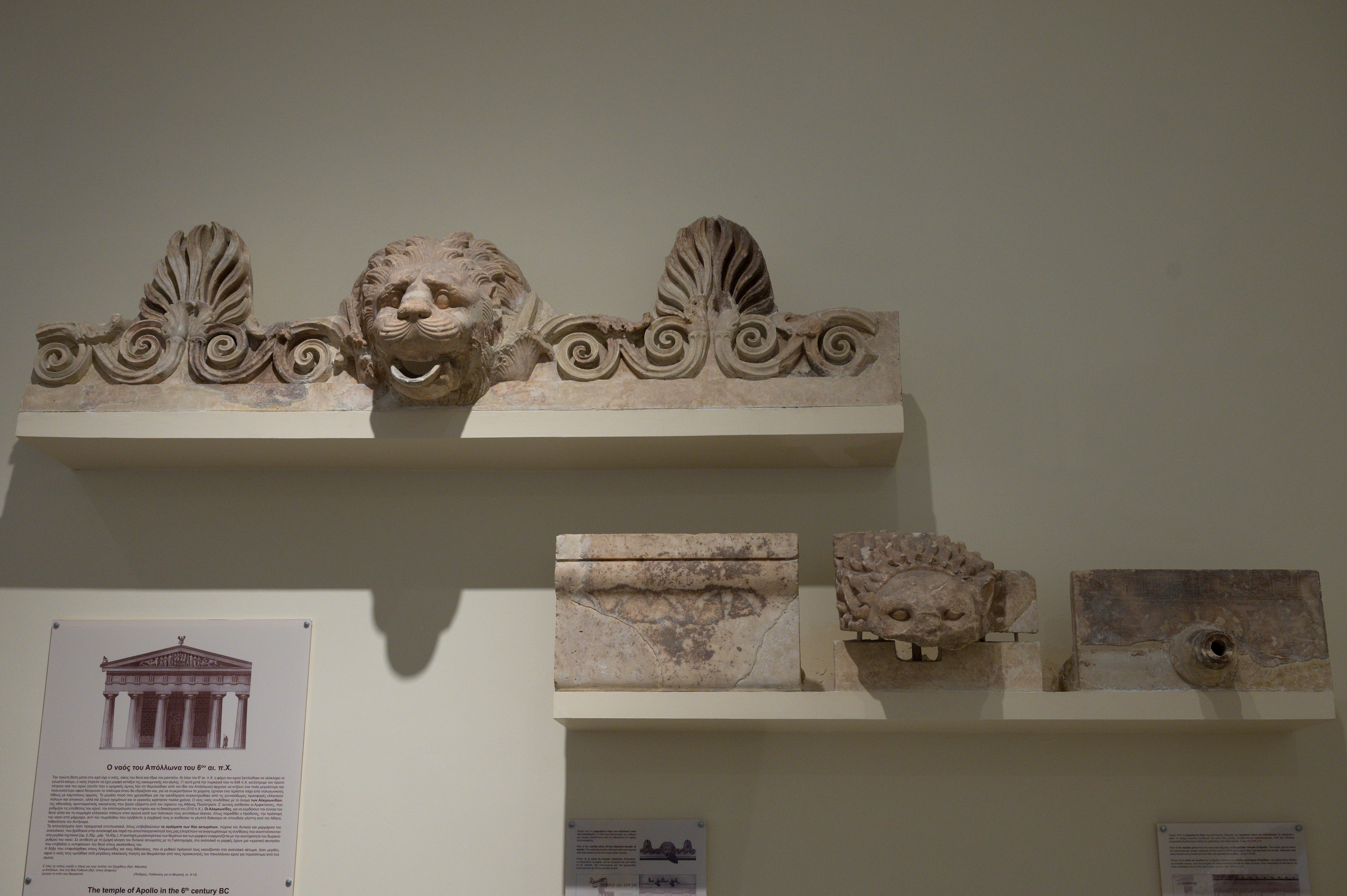
Two marble simas from the Temple of Apollo at Delphi. The top left was from the Classical temple, bottom right was from the Archaic temple. Delphi, Greece. Delphi Archaeological Museum, Delphi.

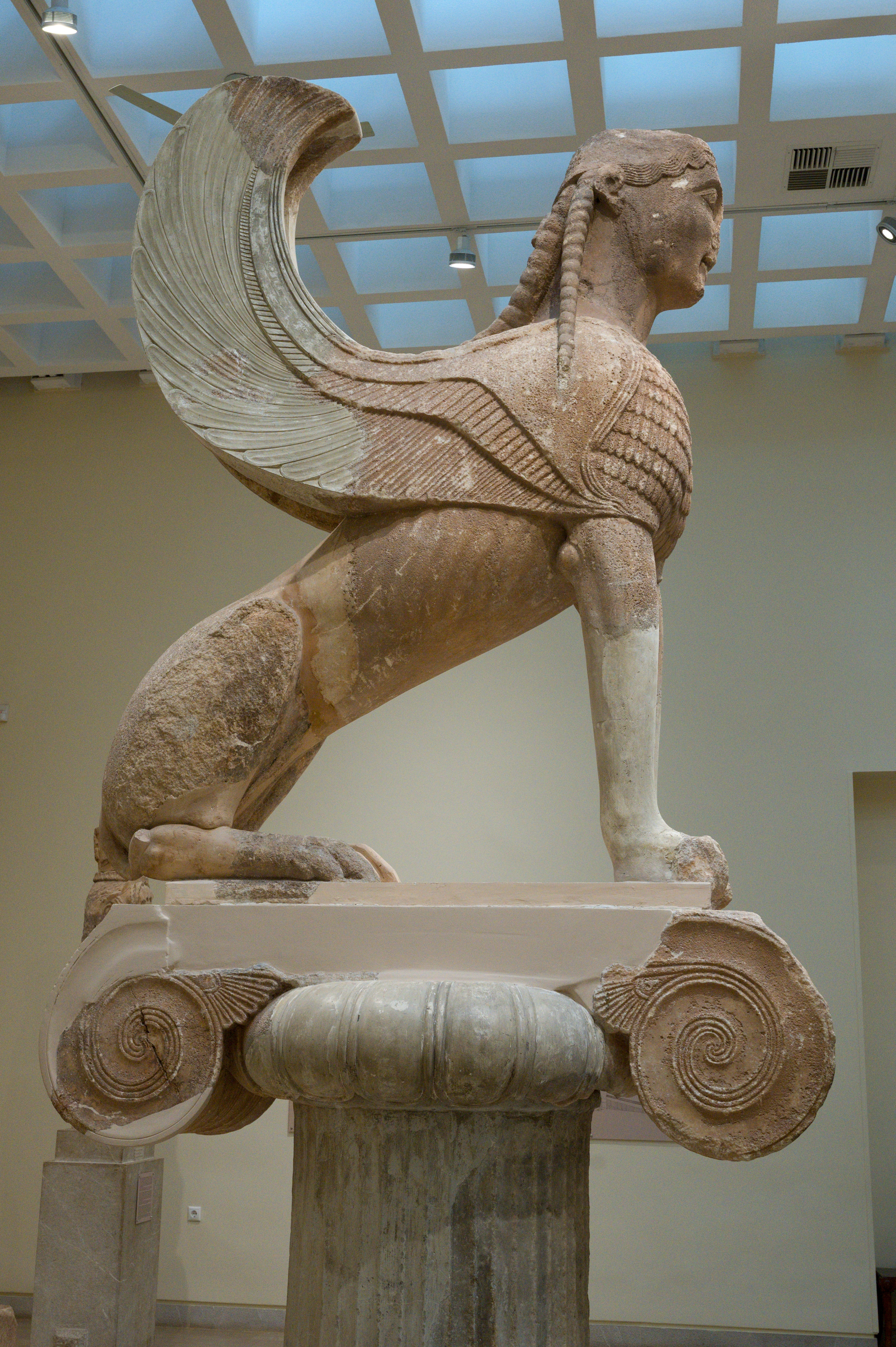
Naxian marble statue of the Sphinx of Naxos which would have sat atop a ten-meter tall Ionic column. Delphi, Greece. Archaic, circa 570-560 B.C.E.Delphi Archaeological Museum, Delphi.

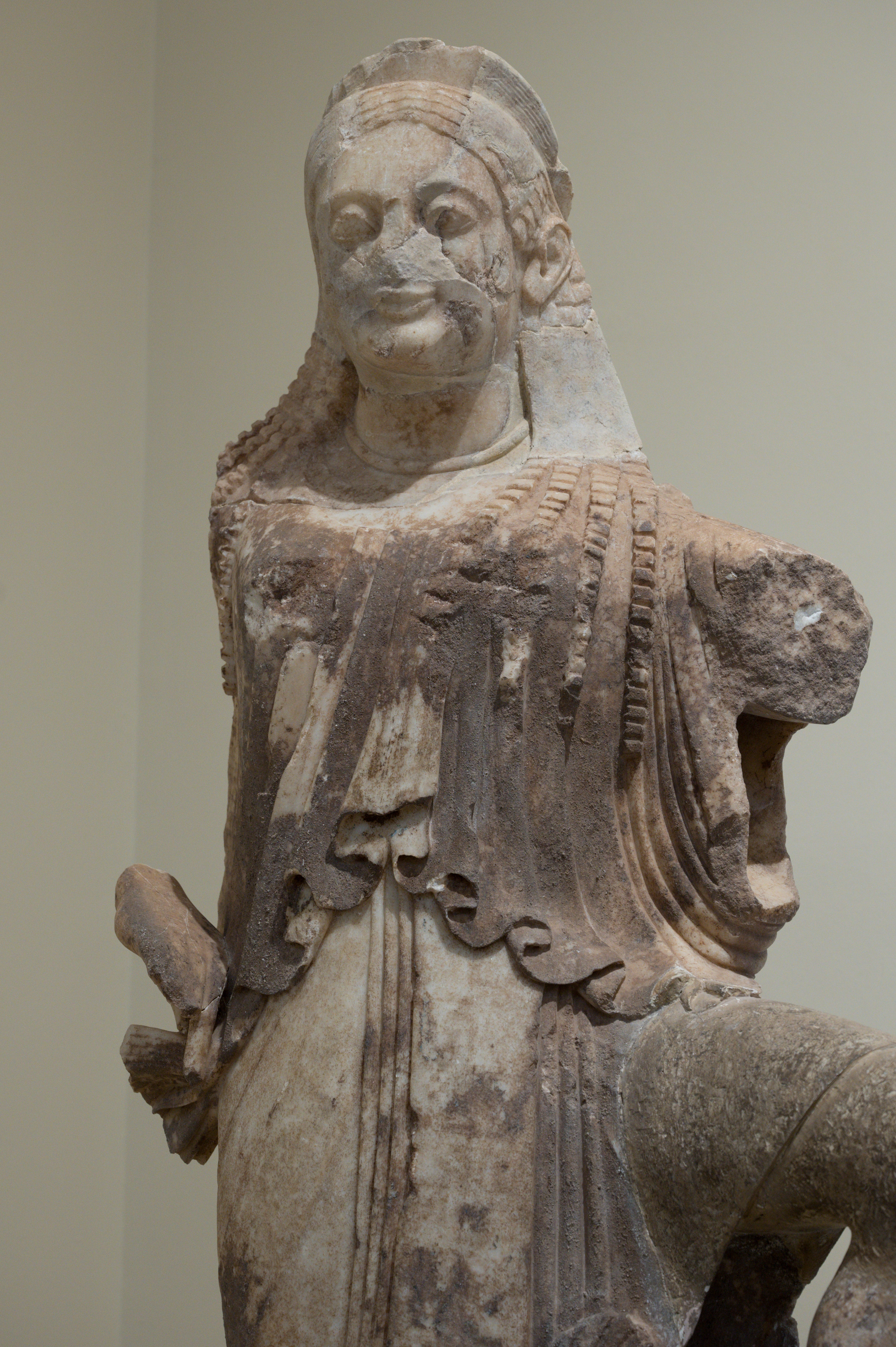
Marble akroterion of the goddess Nike from the Archaic temple. Delphi, Greece. Archaic, 515-505 B.C.E. Delphi Archaeological Museum, Delphi.

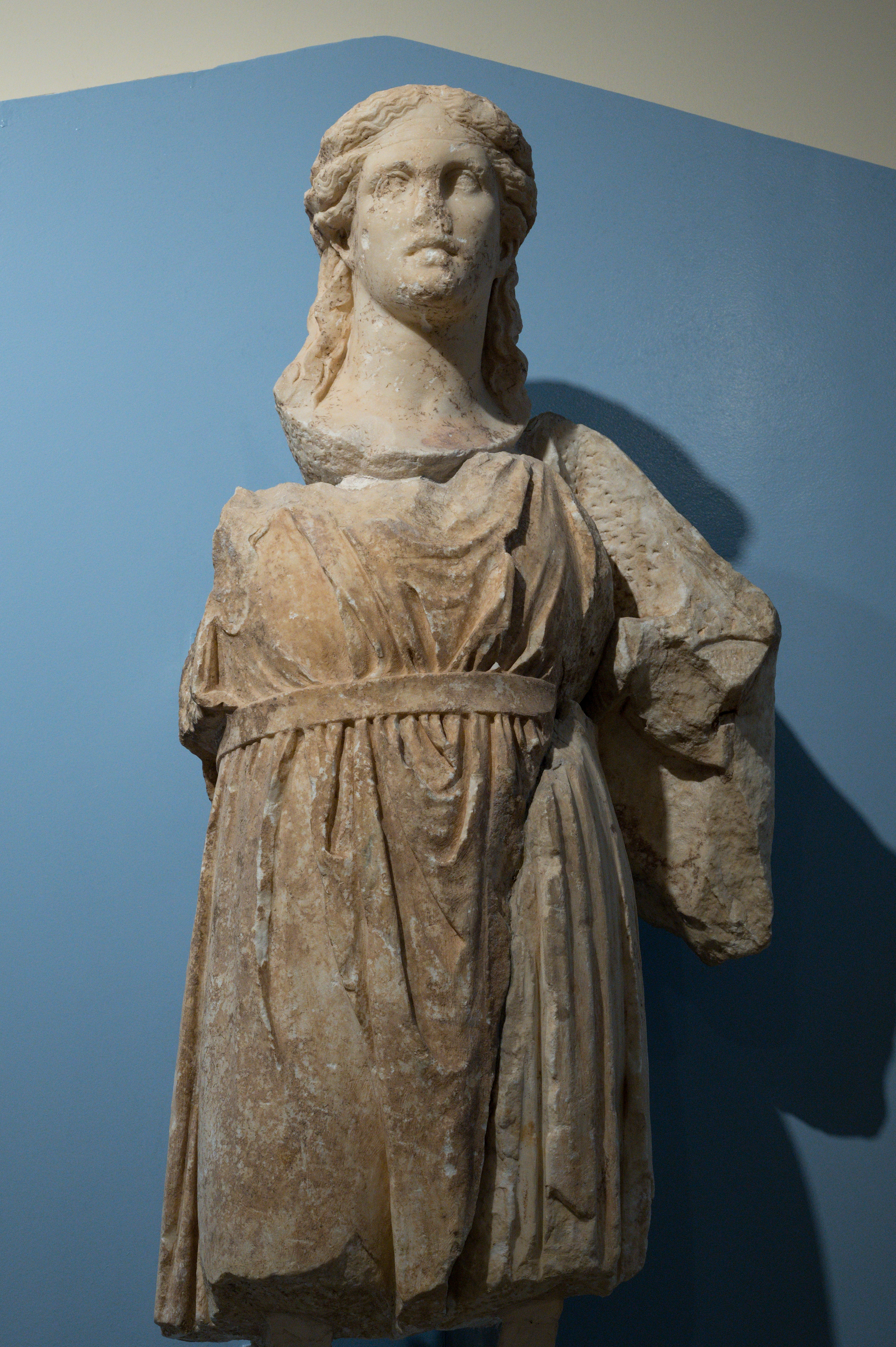
Marble sculpture of Dionysus as a kithara player from the Western Pediment of the Classical temple. Accredited to the sculptors Praxias and Androsthenes. Delphi, Greece. Classical, circa 330 B.C.E. Delphi Archaeological Museum, Delphi.

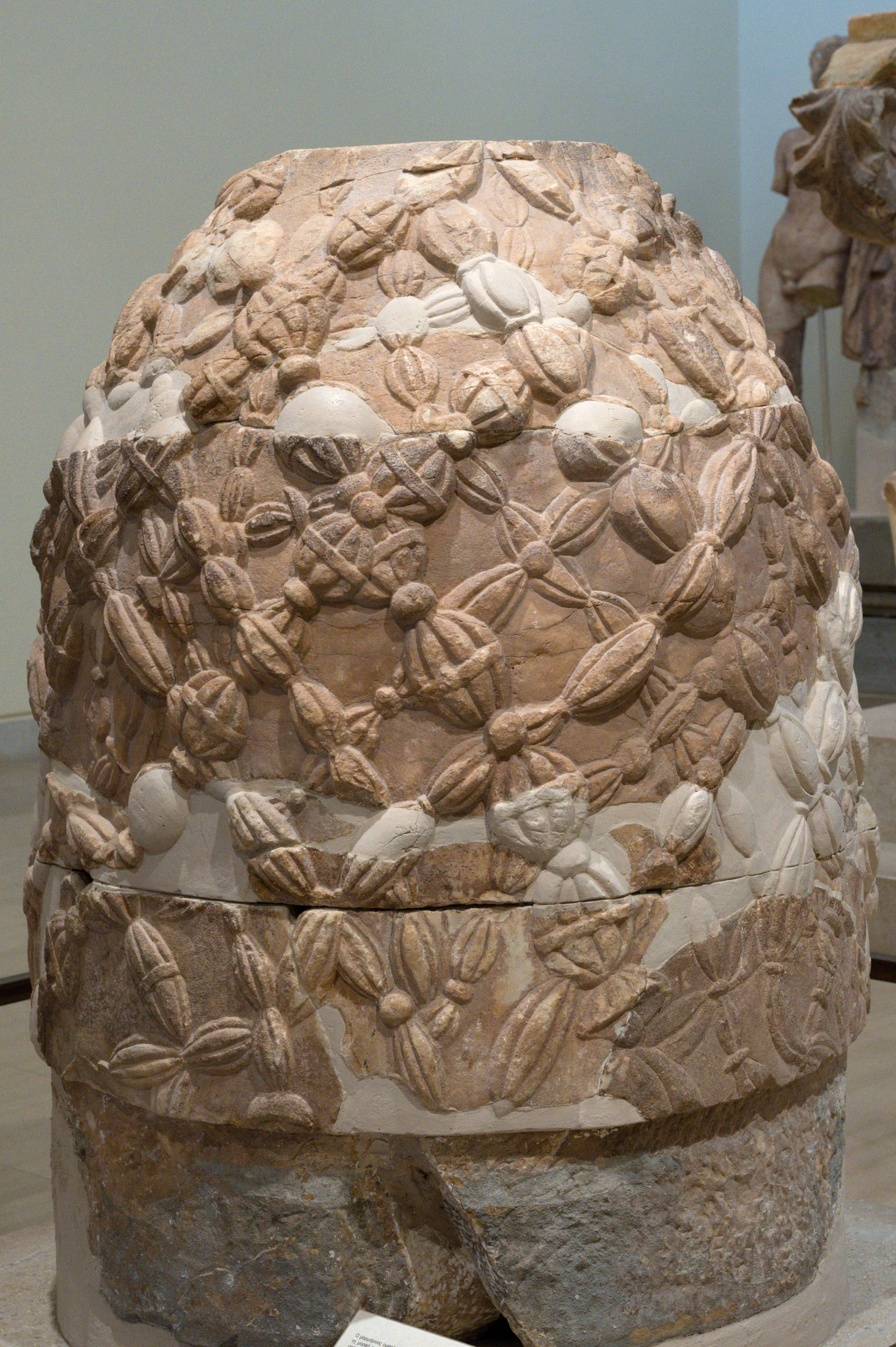
An omphalos found Northeast of the temple, likely a later reproduction of the one that stood in the adyton. Delphi, Greece. Hellenistic or Roman. Delphi Archaeological Museum, Delphi.

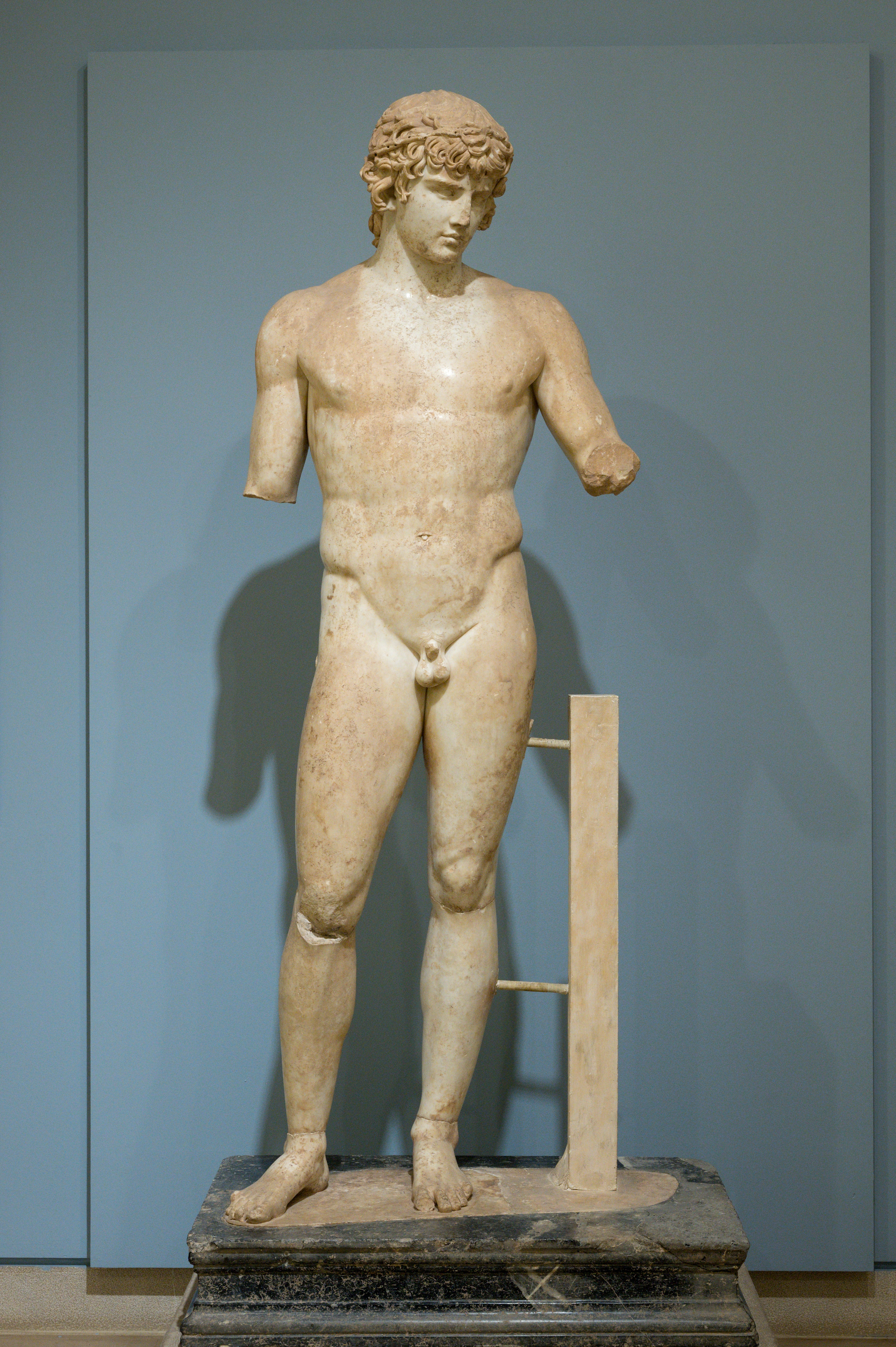
Parian marble sculpture of Antinous, the posthumously deified lover of Hadrian. Delphi, Greece. Roman, circa 117-138 C.E. Delphi Archaeological Museum, Delphi.

== See also ==
- List of Ancient Greek temples
- Pausanias' description of Delphi
