= Peisistratus (disambiguation) =

Peisistratus was a tyrant of Athens, Greece, three different times between 561 and 528 BC.

Peisistratus, Peisistratos or Pisistratus may also refer to:

- Peisistratus (Odyssey), son of Nestor who appears in The Odyssey
- Peisistratos of Lapithos, 4th century BC
- Peisistratus of Orchomenus, king of Arcadian Orchomenus during the Peloponnesian War
- Pisistratus the Younger, r. 522–521 BC, an annual archon of Athens
