= Euaimon =

Town of ancient Arcadia

Euaimon (Ancient Greek: Εὐαίμων) was a town of ancient Arcadia. It is mentioned in an inscription found at Orchomenus that has been dated around 360–350 BCE that registers a union between Euaimon and Orchomenus in which the citizens of Euaimon become part of the citizenship of Orchomenus, although probably Euaimon continued to exist as a city. Stephanus of Byzantium collects a fragment of Theopompus where Euaimon is cited as a city in the territory of Orchomenus. Its site is unlocated.
