= Promanteia =

Privilege of asking the Pythia before simple consultants

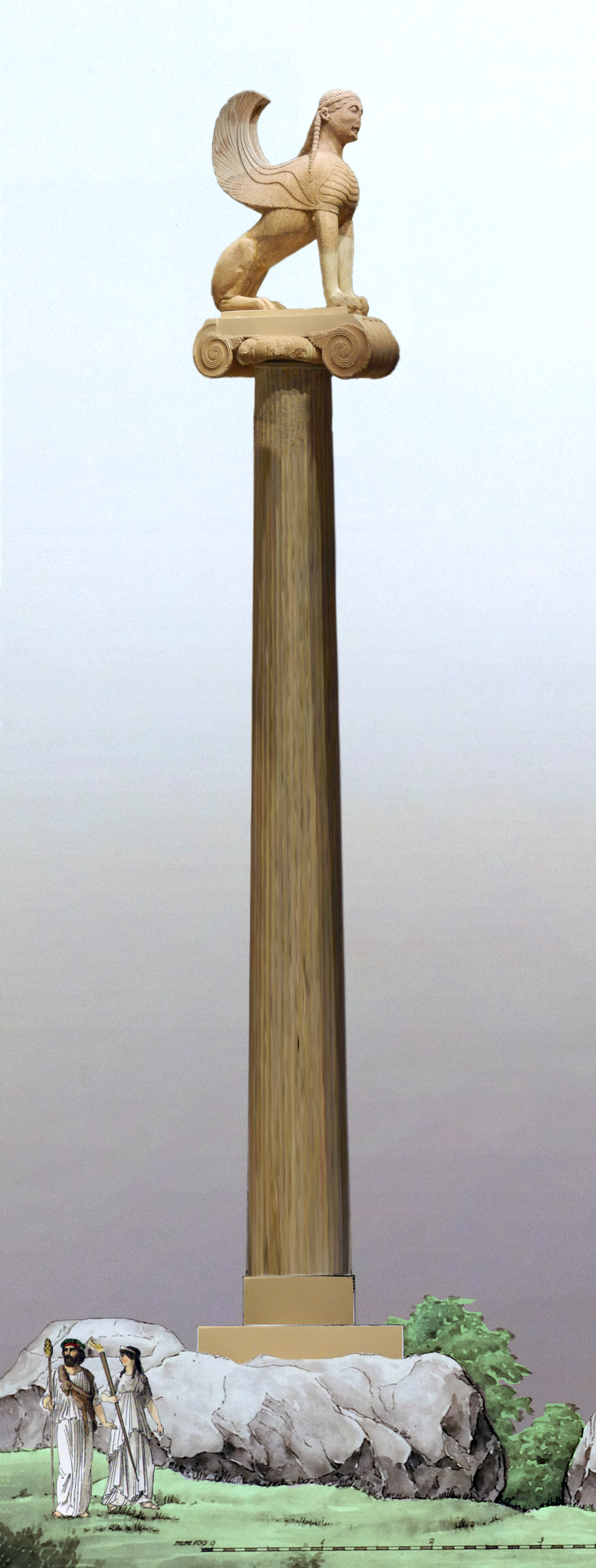
According to the 4th century BCE inscription at the base of the Sphinx of the Naxians in Delphi, the Naxians (inhabitants of Naxos) had "Promanteia".

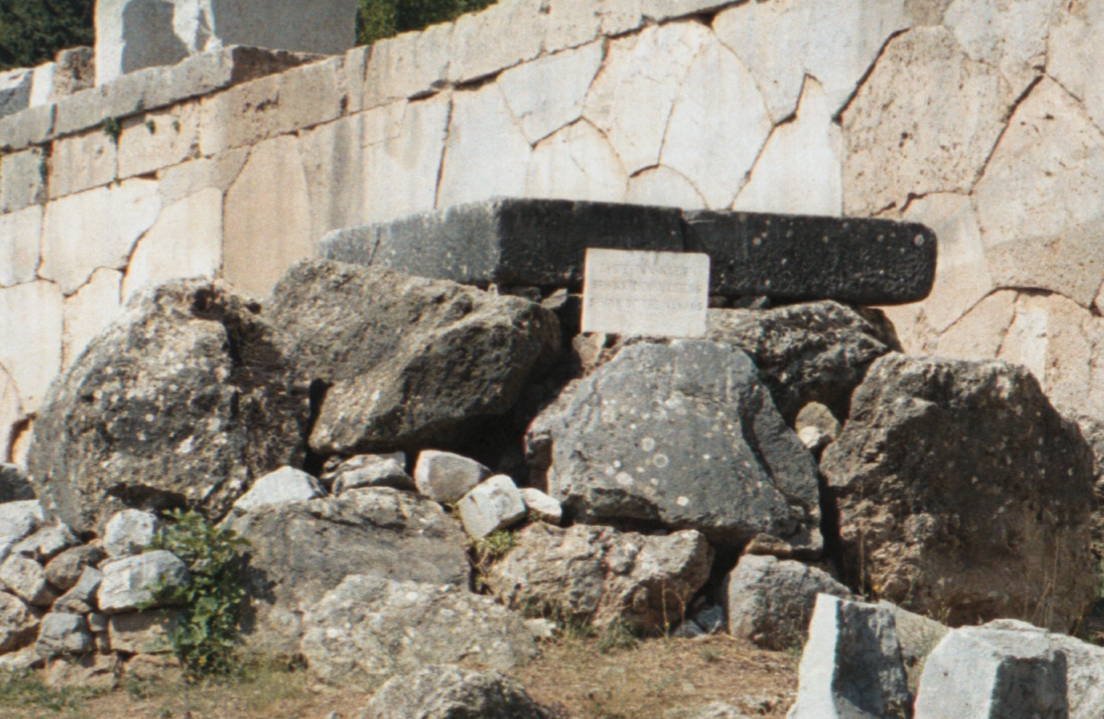
The Naxos Sphinx inscription in Delphi offering Promanteia to the Naxians.

Promanteia was the privilege, bestowed upon cities or individuals by the Oracle of Delphi, to ask the Pythia in priority.

== History ==
In the course of the classical period the priests of Delphi established a series of honours bestowed upon those who offered benefactions to the sanctuary, whether they were cities or individuals. The institution of promanteia was one of the privileges offered initially to cities which had aided the sanctuary financially. Promanteia was in fact the right to acquire an oracle before the others (yet still after the priests and the citizens of Delphi). Given the fact that oracle-giving was taking place on specific – and limited – periods of time, this right could actually be very important. From the beginning of the 4th century BC, this right continued to be accorded to individuals and to be combined with other privileges, such as prothysia and proxenia.

== Naxians ==
On the base of the Sphinx of the Naxians in Delphi, there is an inscription dated to 328–327 BC, renewing the promanteia for the inhabitants of Naxos:

ΔΕΛΦΟΙ ΑΠΕΔΩΚΑΝ ΝΑΞΙΟΙΣ ΤΑΝ ΠΡΟΜΑΝΤΗΙΑΝ ΚΑΤΤΑ ΑΡΧΑΙΑ ΑΡΧΟΝΤΟΣ ΘΕΟΛΥΤΟΥ ΒΟΥΛΕΥΟΝΤΟΣ ΕΠΙΓΕΝΕΟΣ
Delphi accorded the Naxians the right of Promanteia as before, at the time of archon Theolytos and Epigenes the Bouleutes

— Inscription of the Sphinx of the Naxians

== Bibliography ==
Christine Sourvinou-Inwood: What is polis religion? In: Oswyn Murray, Simon R. F. Price (Hrsg.): The Greek city. From Homer to Alexander. Clarendon, Oxford 1990
