= Potaissa Sphinx statue =

The Potaissa Sphinx is a bronze statue of disputed authenticity from the 3rd century, originating in Potaissa, a settlement within the former Roman province of Dacia. This sculpture exhibits striking similarities to the renowned Naxos Sphinx, a masterpiece from 560 BC now housed in the Delphi Archaeological Museum.

== Discovery and History ==
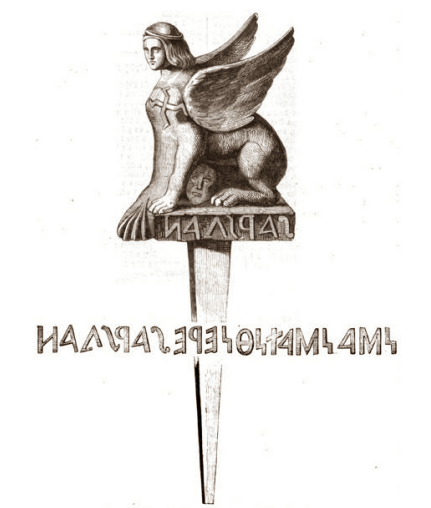
The first depiction of the Potaissa Sphinx, along with the inscription found on it, in the February 6, 1847 issue of the Illustrirte Zeitung.

In February 1847, a German archaeological journal published the first detailed account of the Potaissa Sphinx. The article included a description of the statue, its inscription, and an accompanying drawing. According to contemporary reports, the statue was discovered during an excavation near Turda. The artifact, a bronze sphinx on a quadrangular pedestal, was reportedly found near the Roman settlement of Potaissa, which had served as a base for the Roman Legio V Macedonica.

The statue quickly drew the attention of both archaeologists and linguists. Following a thorough analysis, German archaeologists concluded that both the statue and its inscription were authentic. Despite their extensive efforts, the inscription could not be deciphered. In 1847, Hungarian professor János Érdy-Luczenbacher presented the statue to the Hungarian Academy of Sciences, where it was examined by members of the academy, as well as Croatian, German, and Austrian scholars. However, the inscription on the statue remained undeciphered even during its academic exhibition and continued to elude interpretation for nearly 150 more years. The statue enjoyed significant renown, as an entire page was dedicated to it in the 1847 issue of the Hungarian Academic Bulletin. Before the statue disappeared, it underwent a single comprehensive examination, during which the alloy of the material and the type of degradation typical of archaeological finds were analyzed. The head of the investigation, János Érdy-Luczenbacher, described it as an "unequivocal forgery".

The statue was initially added to the private collection of Count József Kemény, a prominent archaeologist and historian who had led the excavation. Kemény was well-regarded for his efforts to preserve Transylvania’s cultural and historical artifacts. Sadly, during the Hungarian Revolution of 1848–1849, the statue was stolen along with many other treasures from Count József Kemény’s collection when his estate was ransacked. In a heartfelt letter to his friend Sándor Mike, Kemény lamented the loss of these invaluable artifacts, which had been carefully preserved as part of his life’s work. The lack of information about the statue's fate has fueled numerous theories, with some suggesting it was smuggled abroad and now resides in a private collection, while others believe it may have been melted down or irretrievably lost during the chaos. Despite later attempts to locate the statue, its fate remains a mystery, and it is presumed lost to history. Luckily a contemporary description of the statue by historian Ferdinand Neigebaur, who examined it in 1847, provides detailed dimensions. Thanks to Neigebaur's accurate descriptions and drawings, the sculpture has remained available for study after its disappearance.

In 2023, the inscription was finally deciphered, revealing a text in Greek letters that encoded a Hungarian-language phrase, further bolstering the artifact’s historical significance.

=== Historical and Religious Context ===
The statue may have originally been part of a shrine dedicated to the goddess Isis, whose worship was widespread in the Roman Empire. If true, this connection would further underscore the cultural diversity of Potaissa and its significance as a crossroads of Roman and local traditions. The Potaissa Sphinx fits within a broader pattern of sphinx veneration in Pannonia, where similar votive altars dedicated to sphinxes have been discovered in Savaria and Aquincum, underscoring their integration into regional religious practices. The inclusion of a swastika a common solar symbol in ancient art on the Potaissa Sphinx underscores its role as a representation of solar and divine powers, resonating with the religious traditions of the Roman Empire.

== Inscription ==
The mystery of the inscription on the Potaissa Sphinx remained unsolved for nearly 150 years, despite the efforts of several renowned 19th-century scholars. In 2023, the puzzle was finally solved by Dr. Péter Révész, a professor of informatics and honorary professor of classical philology at the University of Nebraska-Lincoln. Through his research, Dr. Révész determined that the inscription is an archaic Hungarian text written in a unique form of the Greek alphabet.

This groundbreaking discovery established the statue as the oldest known written record of the Hungarian language. The inscription, written in an archaic verse form, was later confirmed as authentic by multiple experts and published in journals such as the Mediterranean Archaeology and Archaeometry, Arkeonew or Heritage Daily.

Dr. Révész’s findings also suggested that Hungarian-speaking groups may have been present in the region of Roman Dacia as early as the 3rd century CE, predating the traditional timeline of Hungarian settlement in the Carpathian Basin. This has spurred new discussions and research into the early history of the Hungarian language and its speakers.

After the decipherment however, some researchers such us Mihai Vinereanu called the statue a fake.

=== Decipherment Process ===
Dr. Révész approached the inscription using a combination of linguistic analysis and computational techniques. Recognizing that the text employed a mirrored, right-to-left version of the archaic Greek alphabet, he reconstructed the sequence of letters to reveal a coherent pattern. By interpreting the phonetic values of the letters as representing Hungarian sounds, he identified the inscription as an archaic Hungarian verse. His analysis revealed the following text:

"Íme, imádd: itt híres oroszlán"

("Behold, worship: here lies the sacred lion.")

The inscription, written in a metrical poetic form, provided crucial evidence for the interpretation. This approach not only resolved a century-old puzzle but also confirmed the text as an archaic Hungarian language record, offering insights into early Hungarian culture and its connections to the Carpathian Basin during Roman times.

== Authenticity ==
=== Arguments Against Authenticity ===
Only one examination of the statue was conducted in the 19th century, carried out by the Hungarian Academy of Sciences. The investigation focused on the deterioration of the statue's material (which is to be expected in a 2,000-year-old sculpture), and according to the researchers, the material of the statue was too pristine, leading them to conclude that it was "a clear forgery." The authenticity of the statue is further called into question by the fact that it was discovered by József Kemény, who, although indeed a renowned art collector and archaeologist of his time, had produced a few forged documents early in his career. While his later career was without blemish, the fact that a statue of questionable authenticity happened to surface in his possession only reinforces the suspicion.

=== Arguments For Authenticity ===
According to Dr. Péter Révész, the strongest argument for the statue’s authenticity lies in its inscription, which contains archaic Greek letter forms only identified decades after the statue’s discovery. The Hungarian text, written in Greek script, includes only linguistic forms appropriate for the third century CE, avoiding anachronisms that a 19th-century forger would not have known to omit. Additionally, the statue was presented to the Hungarian Academy of Sciences and examined by Austrian, Hungarian, Croatian, and German historians, further attesting to its physical existence and scholarly recognition in the 19th century.

== See also ==
- Sphinx of Naxos
- Sphinx
- Great Sphinx of Giza
