= Sphinx of Naxos =

Ancient Greek sculpture

Sphinx of Naxos
(560 BC)

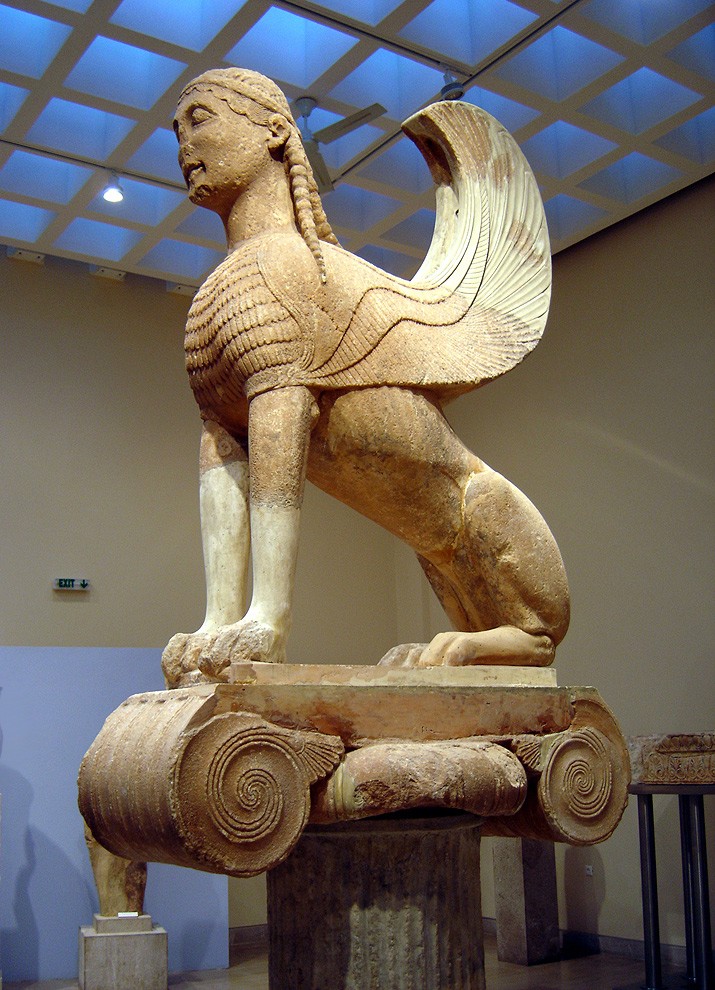
The Sphinx of the Naxians, Delphi Archaeological Museum

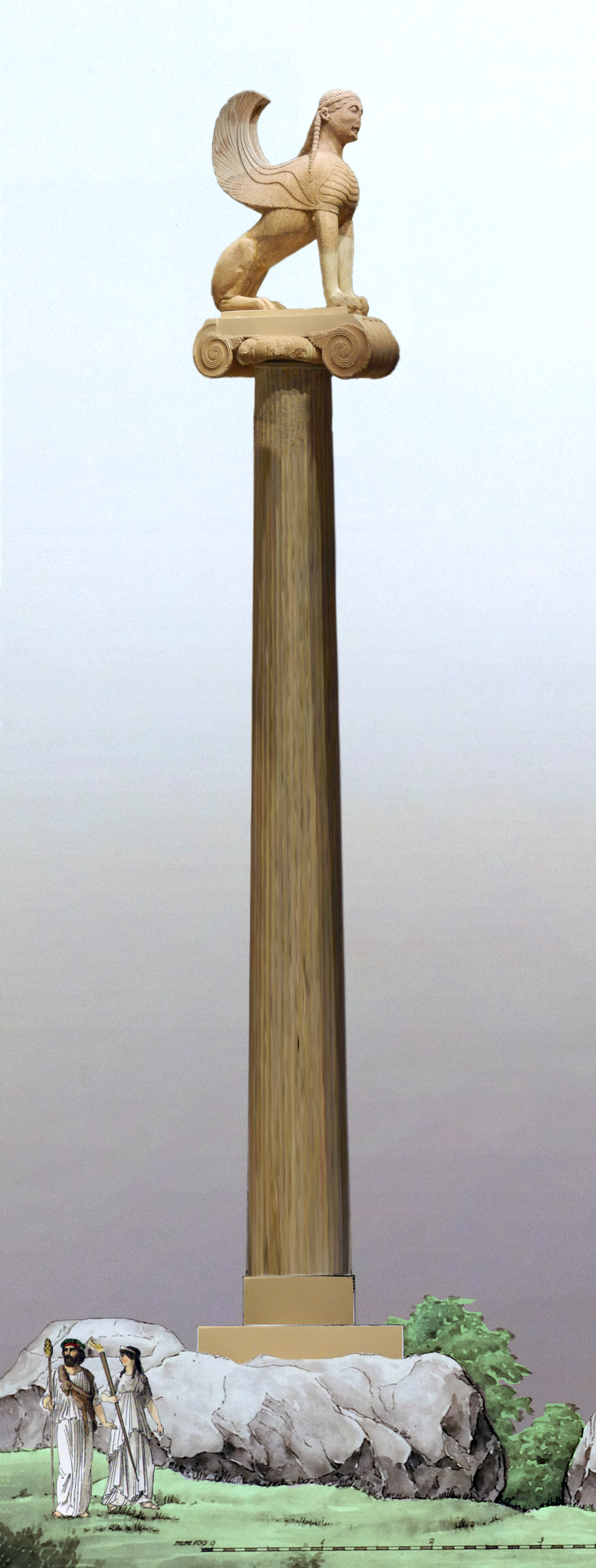
The Naxian Sphinx on its 12.5 meters (41 ft) Ionic column (reconstruction)

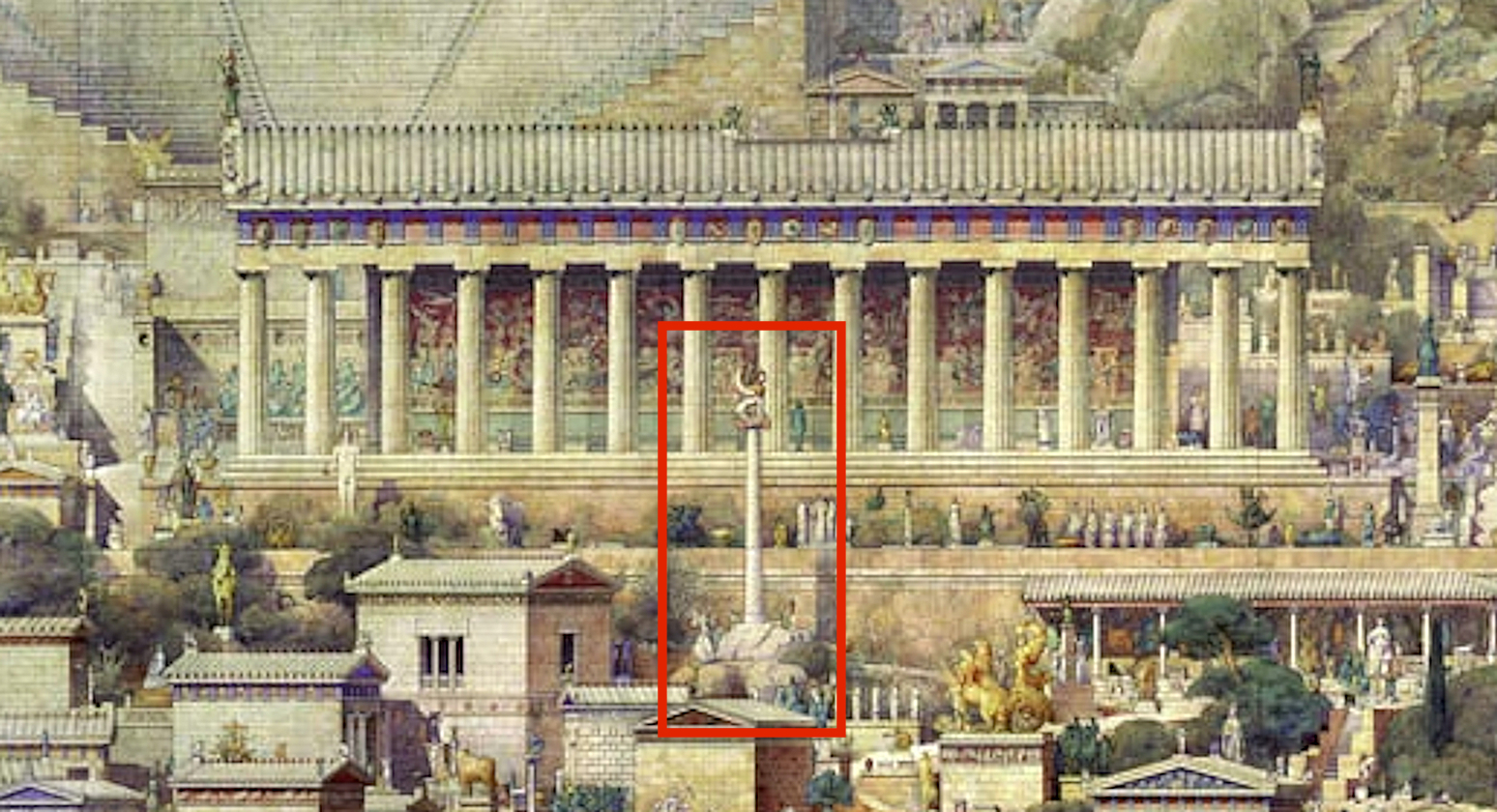
The Sphinx of the Naxians was erected next to the Temple of Apollo in Delphi, the religious center of Ancient Greece.

Original location of the Sphinx of Naxos, at Delphi

The Sphinx of Naxos, also Sphinx of the Naxians, now in the Archaeological Museum of Delphi, is a 2.22-meter-tall (7.3 ft) marble statue of a sphinx, a mythical creature with the head of a woman, the chest and wings composed of the impressive feathers of a prey bird turned upward, and the body of a lioness. The Sphinx stood on a 10 meter column that culminated in one of the first Ionic capitals, and was erected next to the Temple of Apollo in Delphi, the religious center of Ancient Greece, in 560 BCE.

The first fragments were excavated from the sanctuary of the Temple of Apollo in 1860. The remainder was found in 1893. It was originally set up on a stele around 560 BC as a votive offering to the Temple of Apollo by Naxos, one of the richest Cycladic islands at the time. The overall height of the statue, the column and its base topped 12.5 meters.

The Greek sphinx, a lion with the face of a human female, was considered as having ferocious strength, and was thought of as a guardian, often flanking the entrances to temples. Sphinxes' depictions are generally associated with architectural structures such as royal tombs or religious temples.

== Description ==
The famous Sphinx of the Naxians stood on a column that culminated in an Ionic capital.

The statue of this mythical creature stood on a towering Ionic column, which may have been the oldest Ionic construction project in the site of the Oracle of Delphi. Her statue had been set up close to the Halos, the most sacred spot of Delphi, where Apollo had presumably killed the python. According to tradition and its mythological representation, the Sphinx had the face of a woman bearing an enigmatic smile, prey bird wings, and the body of a lioness. It was carved from a large piece of Naxian marble. The solid construction combined elements that gave the statue a character of motion and vitality, such are the details that depict the hair, chest, and wings. It is also notable because it is an early example of carving in-the-round, as opposed to relief carving that was common during that time. The monument was made entirely of marble and reached 12.45 meters in height. The monument created awe to the visitors and constituted a typical example of Naxian sculpture in its peak period, i.e. in the sixth century B.C.

On the base there was an inscription dated to 328-327 B.C., renewing the promanteia for the Naxians:

ΔΕΛΦΟΙ ΑΠΕΔΩΚΑΝ ΝΑΞΙΟΙΣ ΤΑΝ ΠΡΟΜΑΝΤΗΙΑΝ ΚΑΤΤΑ ΑΡΧΑΙΑ ΑΡΧΟΝΤΟΣ ΘΕΟΛΥΤΟΥ ΒΟΥΛΕΥΟΝΤΟΣ ΕΠΙΓΕΝΕΟΣ
Delphi accorded the Naxians the right of Promanteia as before, at the time of archon Theolytos and Epigenes the Bouleutes

— Inscription of the Sphinx of the Naxians

Thus, the Naxians had the right to acquire oracles first.

== Other columns ==
Many more similar columns crowned by sphinxes were discovered in ancient Greece, as in Sparta, Athens or Spata, and some were used as funerary steles.

It has also been suggested that 6th century BCE Greek columns such as the Sphinx of Naxos may have been an inspiration for the pillars of Ashoka in 3rd century BCE India, following the contacts initiated by Alexander the Great in 320 BCE, and continued by the Greco-Bactrians and the Indo-Greeks.

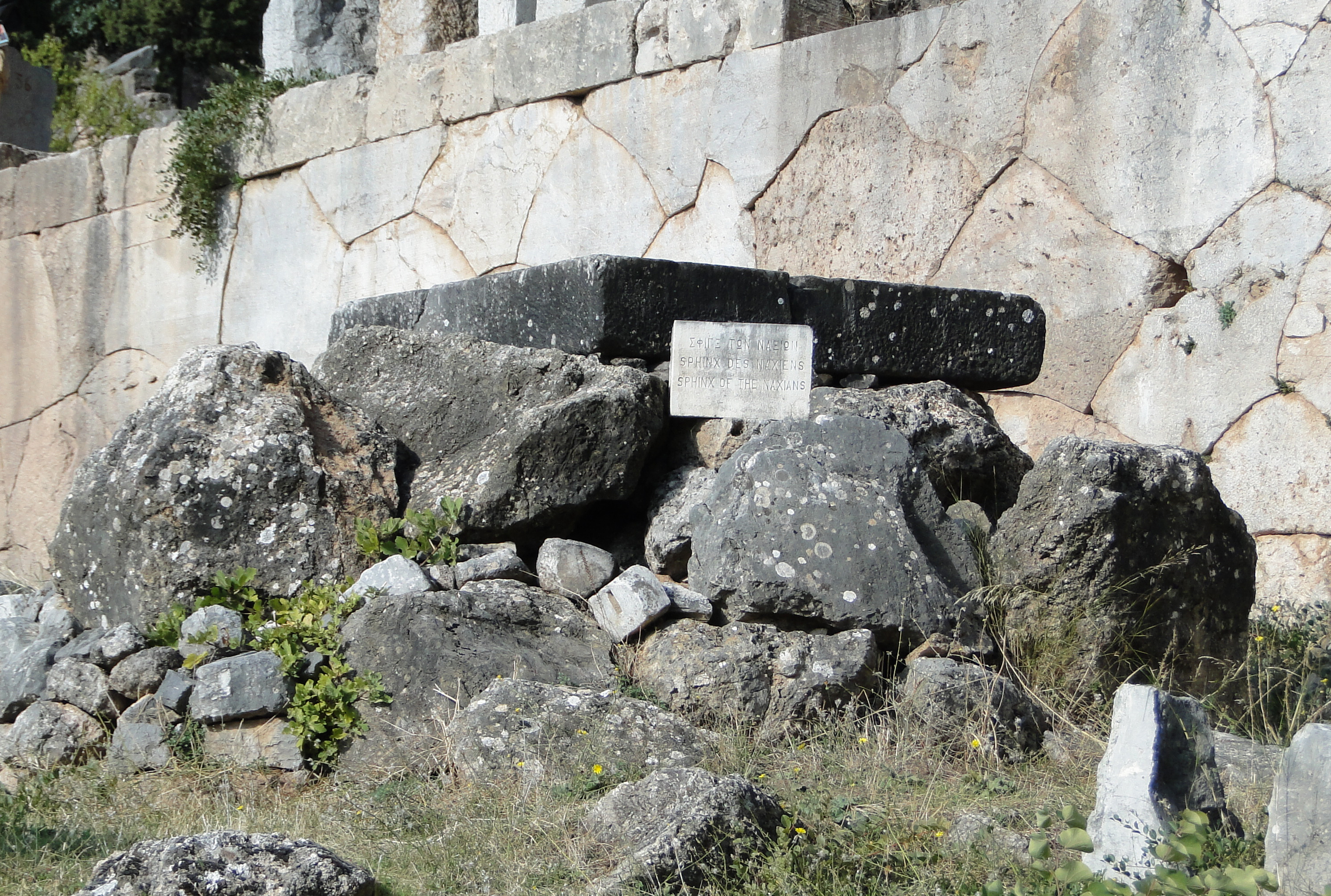
Naxos Sphinx pillar base and notice.

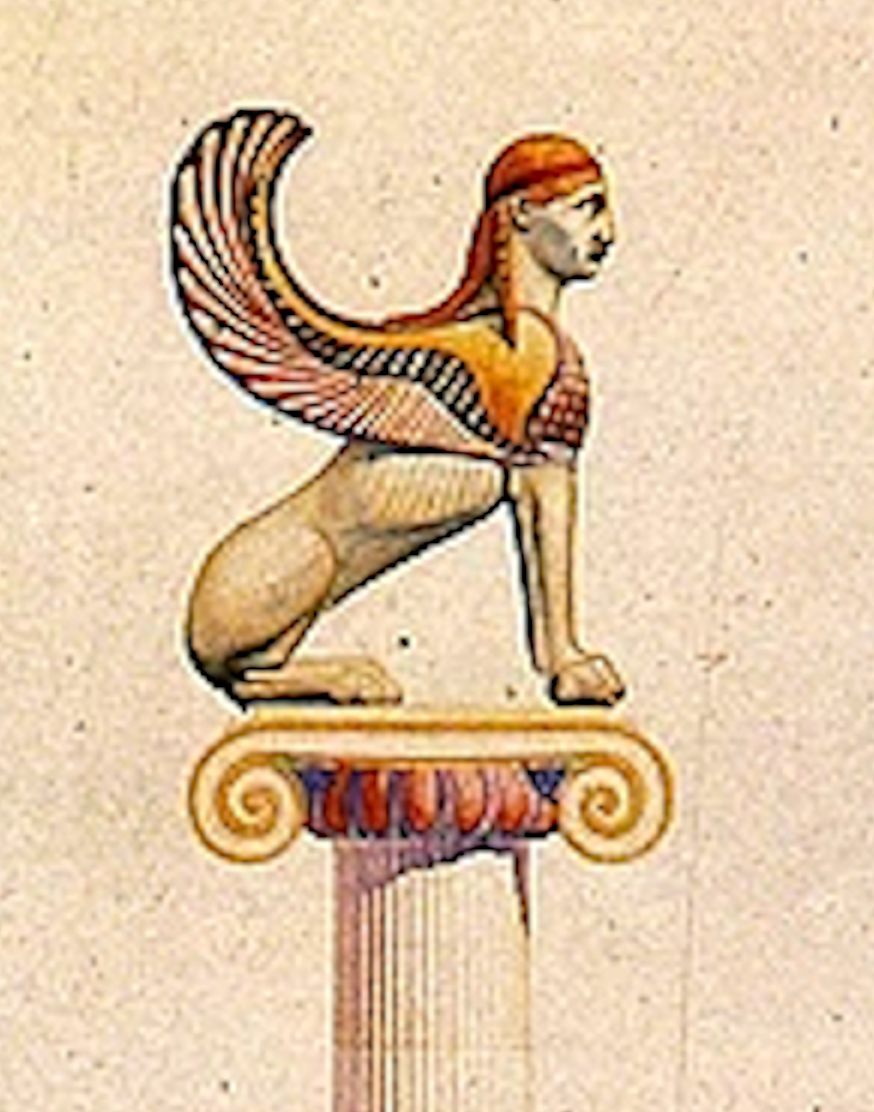
Hypothetical color rendering of the Sphinx of Naxos.

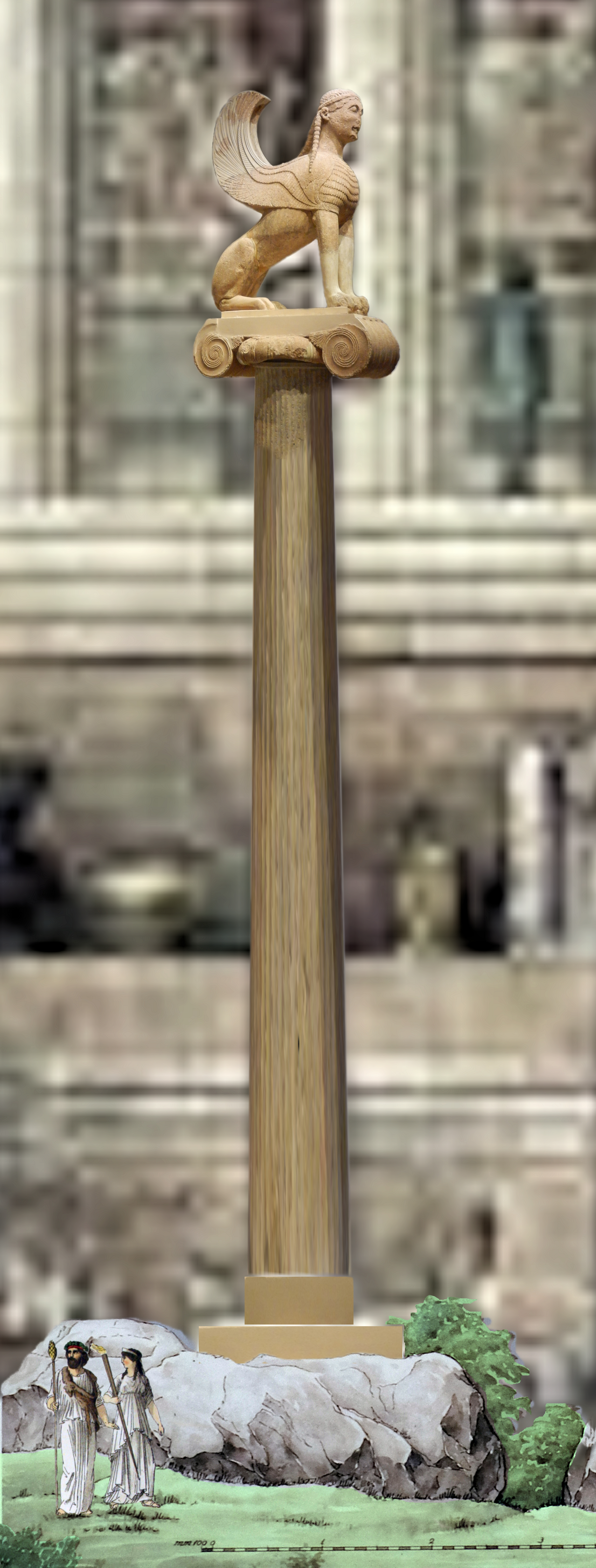
The Sphinx of Naxos in context (Temple of Apollo in the background).

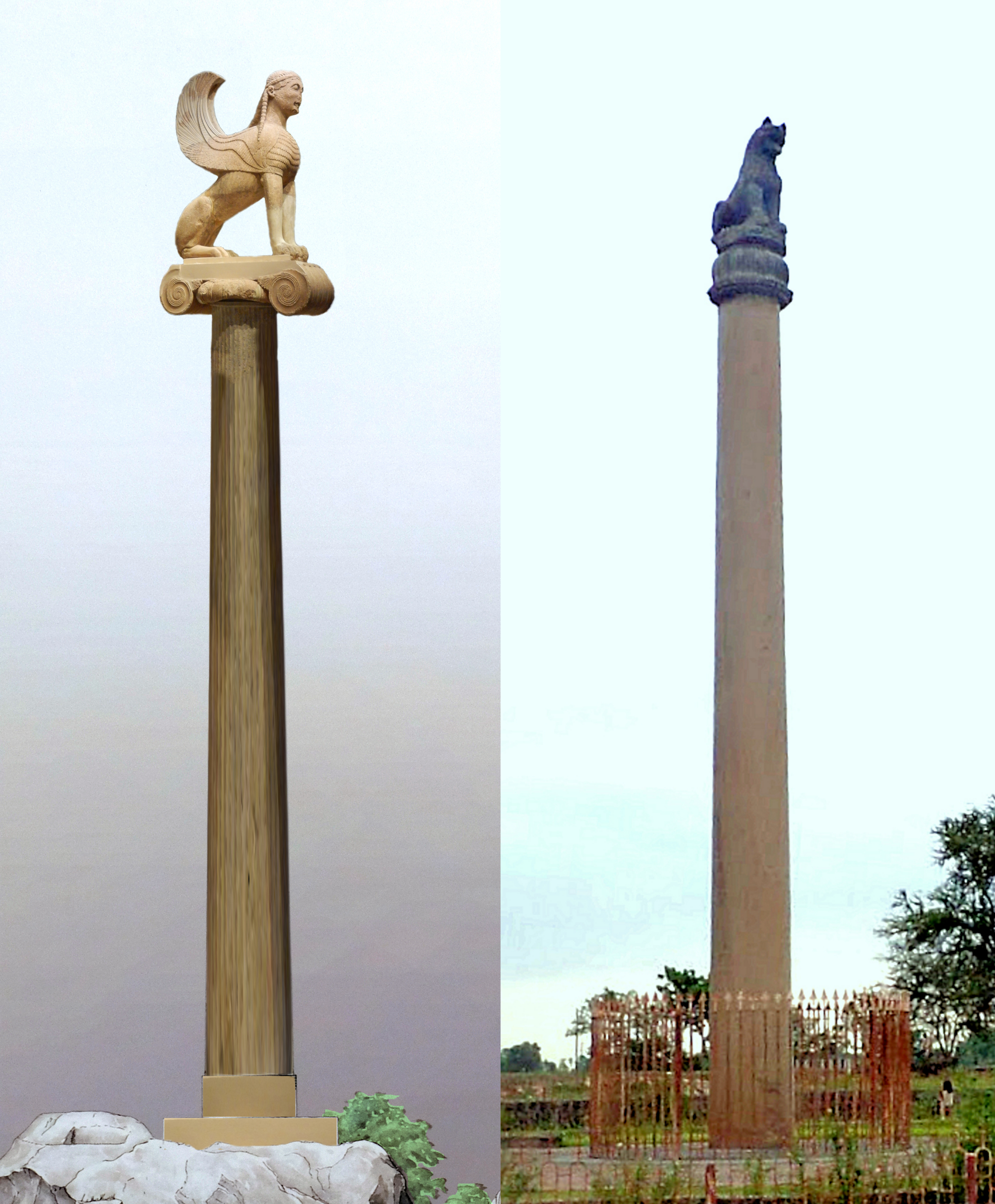
Sphinx of Naxos, 560 BCE, and a Pillar of Ashoka, 250 BCE (here at Lauria Nandangarh).

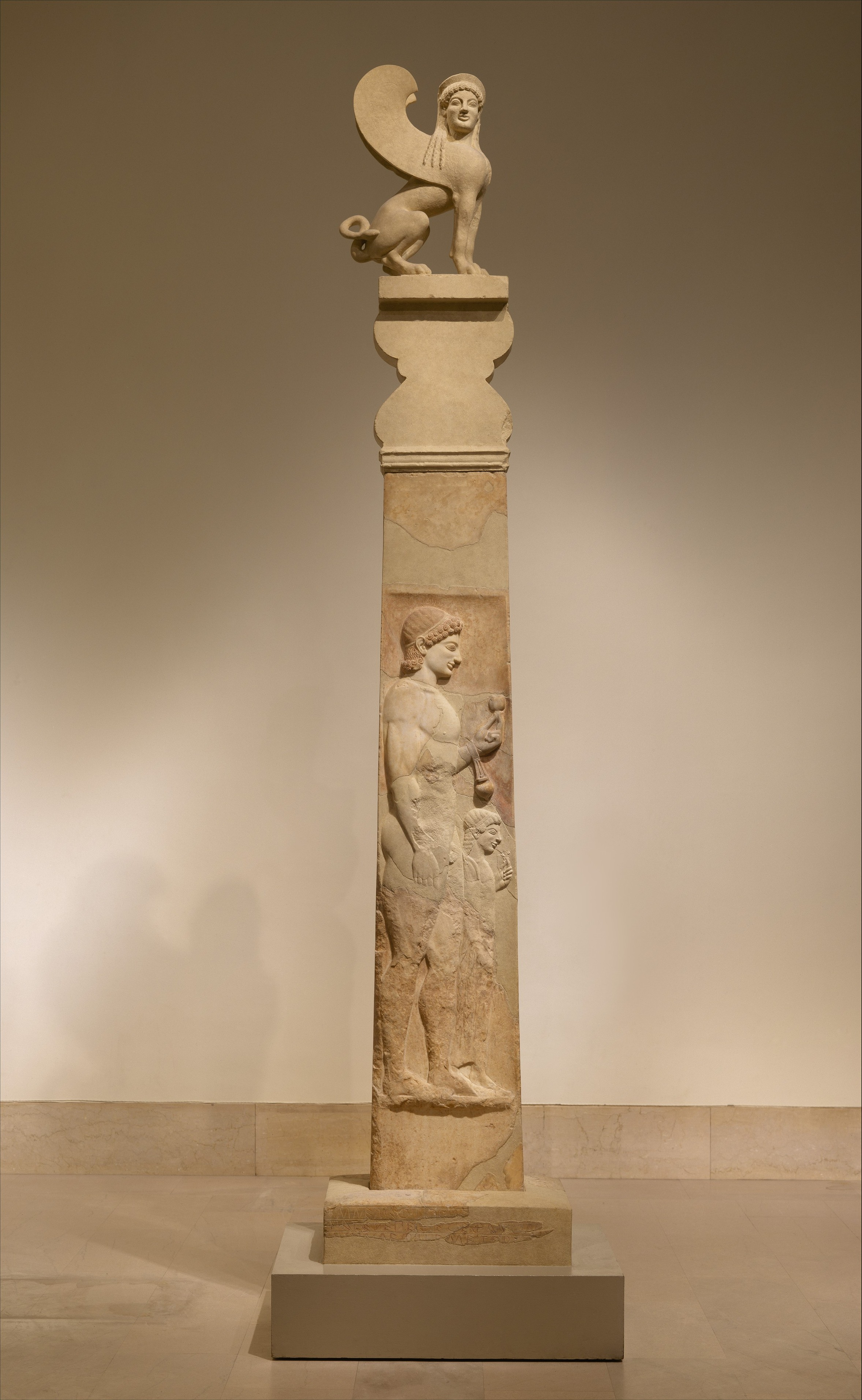
Funerary stela topped by a sphinx, 530 BCE, Greece.

== See also ==
- Potaissa Sphinx statue
- Cesnola Sphinx Funerary Stele
