= Hymnia =

Epithet of the Greek goddess Artemis

Hymnia (Ancient Greek: Ὑμνία) was an epithet of the Greek goddess Artemis under which she was worshipped throughout Arcadia. She had a temple someplace between Orchomenus and Mantineia. We know from the geographer Pausanias that Orchomenus at least used to hold festivals in her honor.

The priests and priestesses of Hymnia were at first always virgins who were to remain celibate in the priesthood. They were also subject to high standards of propriety, such as being forbidden to enter into the home of a private individual. This lifetime celibacy was fairly unusual for ancient Greek priesthoods.

In the early 7th century BCE, after the king Aristocrates of Orchomenus raped one of the priestesses in the temple, it was deemed that the priestess should always be a married woman, or, according to some, an elderly woman, or one who had simply ceased or had "enough" sex with men.

The sanctuary of Artemis Hymnia is believed to have been near the modern town of Levidi, on the northern slope of Mt. Anchisia.
