= Aristocrates of Orchomenus =

Ancient Greek rulers of Orchomenus

Aristocrates (Ancient Greek: Ἀριστοκράτης) was a name belonging to two ancient Greek rulers in Orchomenus in Arcadia.

The elder Aristocrates of Orchomenus was the son of Aechmis. He was stoned to death by his own people for chasing a virgin-priestess of Artemis Hymnia into the temple and raping her beside a statue of the goddess. This story has some similarities to the one about Aristoclides that was first described by Church Father Saint Jerome in his work Against Jovinianus.

The younger Aristocrates of Orchomenus (or sometimes Aristocrates II) was a son of Hicetas, and grandson of the preceding. He served as the leader of the Arcadians in the Second Messenian War, when they espoused with other nations in the Peloponnesus the side of the Messenians. He was bribed by the Lacedaemonians and was guilty of treachery at the Battle of the Great Foss; and when this was discovered some years afterwards, he was, like his grandfather, stoned to death by the Arcadians.

His family was either merely deprived of their sovereignty (according to the writer Pausanias) or completely destroyed (according to Polybius). Later critics believed the latter statement could not be correct, as we know that his son Aristodamus ruled over Orchomenus and a great part of Arcadia. The date of this Aristocrates appears to have been about 680-640 BCE.
