= Spintharus of Corinth =

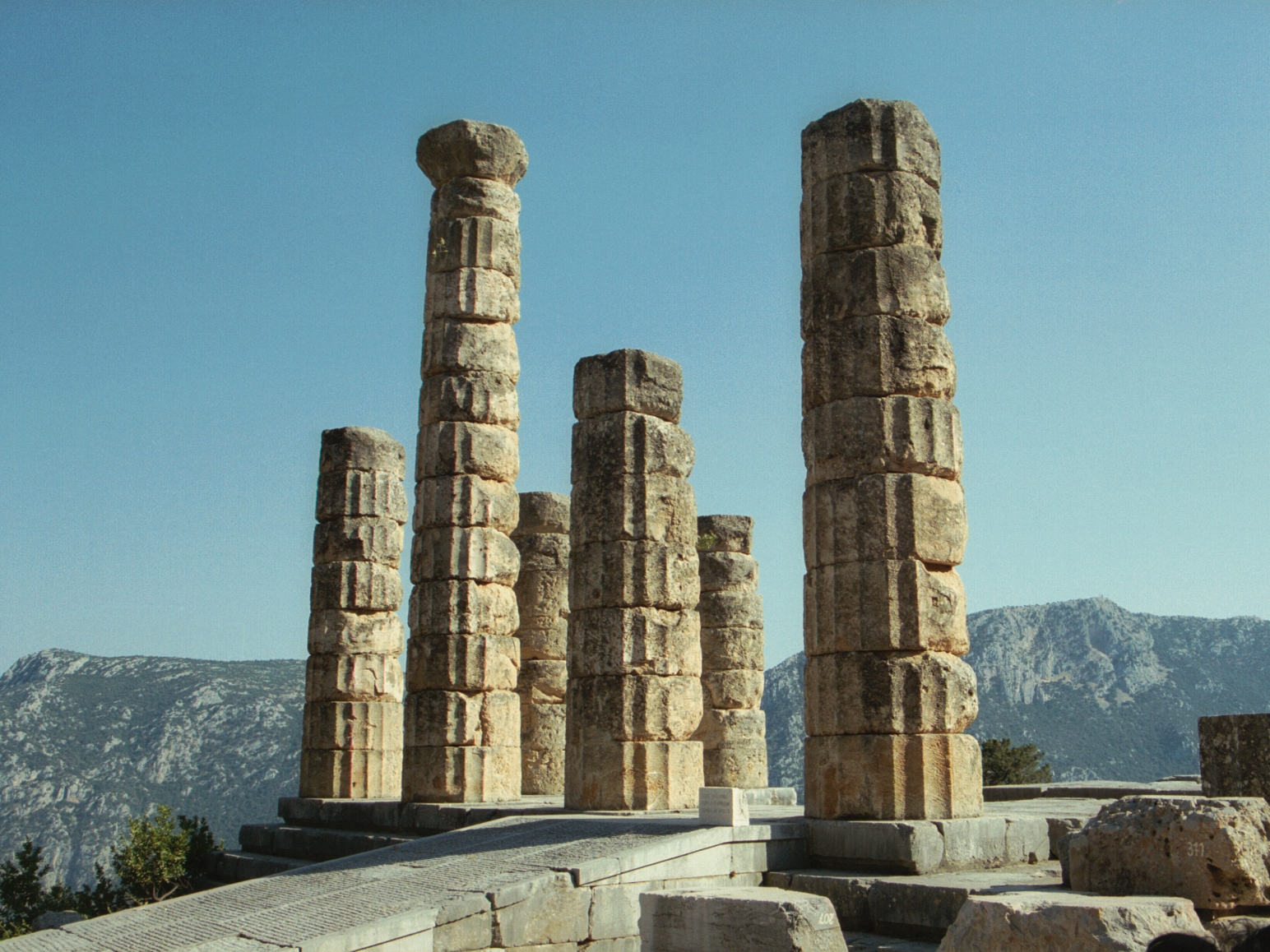
Ruins of the Temple of Apollo at Delphi

Spintharus of Corinth (Ancient Greek: Σπίνθαρος, romanized: Spíntharos) was an ancient Greek architect. Pausanias reported in his Description of Greece that the Alcmaeonids hired him to build a temple at Delphi. (Note: Pausanias. Hellados Periegesis. X.5.13. "τέταρτος δὲ ὑπὸ Τροφωνίου μὲν εἰργάσθη καὶ Ἀγαμήδους, λίθου δὲ αὐτὸν ποιηθῆναι μνημονεύουσι: κατεκαύθη δὲ Ἐρξικλείδου μὲν Ἀθήνῃσιν ἄρχοντος, πρώτῳ δὲ τῆς ὀγδόης Ὀλυμπιάδος ἔτει καὶ πεντηκοστῆς, ἣν Κροτωνιάτης ἐνίκα Διόγνητος. τὸν δ' ἐφ' ἡμῶν τῷ θεῷ ναὸν ᾠκοδόμησαν μὲν ἀπὸ τῶν ἱερῶν οἱ Ἀμφικτύονες χρημάτων, ἀρχιτέκτων δέ τις Σπίνθαρος ἐγένετο αὐτοῦ Κορίνθιος." Translations include: T. Taylor (1794), J. G. Frazer (1898), W. H. S. Jones (1935), and Peter Levi (1971).) This is the only record of Spintharus. The temple to Apollo at Delphi had to be rebuilt after a fire in 548 BC and again after an earthquake in 373 BC. Historians have offered competing claims as to which temple Spintharus constructed.

== Debate on chronology ==
J. B. Bury argued he built the 6th century temple because of accounts saying the fourth century temple was built by Xenodorus. John Henry Middleton dated Spintharus's construction to the latter half of the sixth century, BC. Karl Julius Sillig wrote Spintharus lived around the time of the 60th Olympiad, i.e., 540 BC.

However, James George Frazer argued he built the fourth century temple. He notes that Xenodorus is inscribed as the fourth century architect, but suggests Spintharus planned and began construction and Xenodorus continued construction after his death. Janina K. Darling reports Spintharus began construction in 346 BC and after his death the project was completed by the architects Xenodorus and Agathon. Hélène Perdicoyianni-Paléologou also lists all three architects as working on the rebuilding of the temple, which was completed in 320 BC. William Bell Dinsmoor notes that expense reports suggest that Xenodorus and Agathon continued Spintharus' construction on the fourth century temple. It has also been suggested that Spintharus was the "chief designer" whereas Xenodorus and Agathon were directly in charge of supervising construction.

== Other possible works ==
Middleton also suggested Spintharus also built the temple at Corinth due to similarities in some of the details such as the hypotrachelia.

== See also ==
- Ancient Greek architecture
- List of Ancient Greek temples
- Apollo § Temples of Apollo
