= Aristoclides =

Painter mentioned by Pliny

Aristoclides was a painter mentioned by Pliny the Elder as one of those who deserved to be ranked next to the "masters" in their art. His age and country are unknown. He painted the temple of Apollo at Delphi. It is said that he was famous before the public of Athens, and attracted many great artists to himself.

There was also another Aristoclides mentioned in the third Nemean Ode of the poet Pindar, and is ostensibly the friend of Pindar to whom the ode is addressed. While it is often written in English as "Aristoclides", this person's name is more commonly transliterated from the Greek as Aristocleidas.

There was still another Aristoclides, this one apparently a tyrant of ancient Greek Orchomenus, whose first known reference is in the treatise on marriage and virginity called Against Jovinianus, written by Church Father Saint Jerome. The tale told of Aristoclides is that he killed the father of the virgin Stymphalides, whom he desired, and afterwards pursued her into the temple of the goddess Diana. Stymphalides clung to the statue of Diana in the temple, refusing to give herself to Aristoclides, and Aristoclides stabbed her to death. It is this Aristoclides who is described as "Aristoclides of Orchomenus" in The Franklin's Tale of The Canterbury Tales of Geoffrey Chaucer, referenced by one character as an example of how women ought to behave regarding the preservation of their virginity.

This tale is possibly a mythical retelling of the tale of Aristocrates of Orchomenus, which is similar.
