= Peisistratus of Orchomenus =

Peisistratus, Peisitratos or Pisistratus (/paɪˈsɪstrətəs/; Ancient Greek: Πεισίστρατος) was king of Arcadian Orchomenus at the time of the Peloponnesian War.

He became the object of the hatred of the oligarchical party and was murdered in an assembly of the senate. To hide the crime, body was cut to pieces and the parts carried away by the senators under their robes. Tlesimachus, the son of Peisistratus, who was privy to the conspiracy, quieted the populace, who were incensed at the disappearance of their king, by a story of his having appeared to him in a superhuman form after he had left the earth.
