= Theophilus (geographer) =

Historian and geographer

Theophilus (Greek: Θεόφιλος) was a historian and geographer, if at least the passages about to be quoted refer to one and the same person. He is mentioned by Josephus (c. Apion. i. 23) among those writers, who had noticed the Jews. The third book of his work on Italy (Ίταλικά), and the second of that on the Peloponnesus, are quoted by Plutarch (Parallela Minora, 13, 32, pp. 309, a., 313, d). Ptolemy (Geogr. i. 9. § 3) quotes a statement from some geographical work by Theophilus, the title of which he does not mention, but which is no doubt the same as the Περιήγησις, the eleventh book of which is referred to by Stephanus of Byzantium (s. v. (Παλική). Plutarch also (de Fluv. 24) cites the first book of a work of Theophilus. (Vossius, de Hist. Graec. p. 504, ed. Westermann.)
