= Orchomenus (Arcadia) =

Ancient Greek city in Arcadia

- Ὀρχομενός (Greek)
- Orchomenos
- Location within Greece
- 37°43′29″N 22°18′55″E
- Type: Settlement
- Location: Orchomenos, Peloponnese, Greece
- Region: Arcadia

Site notes
- Management: 39th Ephorate of Prehistoric and Classical Antiquities
- Public access: Yes
- Website: Hellenic Ministry of Culture and Tourism

Orchomenus or Orchomenos (Greek: Ὀρχομενός) was an ancient city of Arcadia, Greece, called by Thucydides (v. 61) the Arcadian Orchomenus (Ὀρχομενός ὁ Ἀρκαδικός), to distinguish it from the Boeotian town.

Originating as a prehistoric settlement, Orchomenus became one of the powerful cities in West Arcadia along with Tegea and Mantineia. The heyday of the city was between 7th–6th century BC and it became a rich city which minted its own currency.

Its ruins are near the modern village of Orchomenos (before 1963: Καλπάκι, Kalpaki).

== Site ==
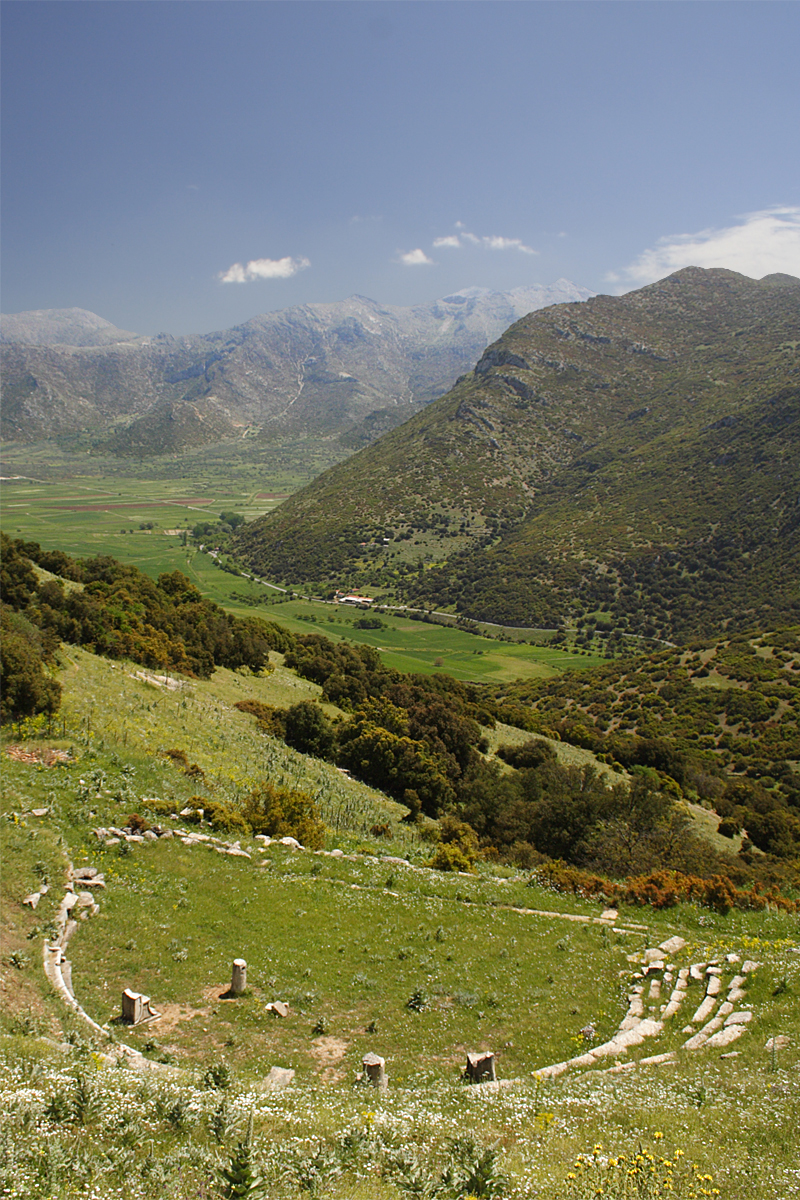
Orchomenos theatre and Karst depression

Orchomenos was initially established at the foot of the acropolis on a plain surrounded on every side by mountains. Later the settlement was built on the mountain where the most important monuments of the city have been found. The modern village of Orchomenos stands on the site of lower Orchomenus.

This plain was bounded on the south by a low range of hills, called Anchisia, which separated it from the territory of Mantineia: on the north by a lofty chain, called Oligyrtus, through which lie the passes into the territories of Pheneus and Stymphalus, and on the east and west by two parallel chains running from north to south.

The plain is divided into two by hills projecting from the eastern and western ranges, and which approach so close as to allow space for only a narrow ravine between them. Upon the summit of the western hill stood the acropolis of Orchomenus, nearly 900 m (3,000 ft) high, resembling the strong fortress of Messenian Ithome and, like the latter, commanding two plains. The waters of the southern part of the plain run through the ravine into the northern plain where, as there is no outlet for the waters, they formed a large lake. This description is that of Pausanias’ time, AD 110 – ca. 180). Today the lake is gone. The two plains are characterized as closed geological basins (Karst depressions), where, even today, precipitation has a seasonally inadequate subsurface drainage by ditches, Katavothres (Greek term for ponors) and a man made tunnel.

== History ==
Orchomenus is mentioned by Homer, who gives it the epithet of polymelos (πολύμηλος), which meant "abundant in sheep". It is one of the places whose troops were led by Agapenor. It is also called ferax by Ovid, and ἀφνεός by Apollonius Rhodius.

Pausanias relates that Orchomenus was founded by an eponymous hero, the son of Lycaon; but there was a tradition that, on the death of Arcas, his dominions were divided among his three sons, of whom Elatus obtained Orchomenus as his portion. The kings of Orchomenus are said to have ruled over nearly all Arcadia. Pausanias also gives a list of the kings of Orchomenus, whom he represents at the same time as kings of Arcadia. One of these kings, Aristocrates, the son of Aechmis, was stoned to death by his people for violating the virgin priestess of Artemis Hymnia. Aristocrates was succeeded by his son Hicetas, and Hicetas by his son Aristocrates II who, having abandoned the Messenians in the second war against Sparta, experienced the fate of his grandfather being stoned to death by the Arcadians. He appears to have been the last king of Orchomenus, who reigned over Arcadia, but his family was not deprived of the kingdom of Orchomenus as is stated in some authorities since we find his son Aristodemus represented as king of the city. It would appear, indeed, that royalty continued to exist at Orchomenus long after its abolition in most other Greek cities, since Theophilus related that Peisistratus, king of Orchomenus, was put to death by the aristocracy in the Peloponnesian War.

In the Persian Wars, Orchomenus sent 120 men to Thermopylae, and 600 to Plataea. In the Peloponnesian War, the Lacedaemonians deposited in Orchomenus the hostages they had taken from the Arcadians; but the walls of the city were then in a dilapidated state; and accordingly, when the Athenians and their Peloponnesian allies advanced against the city in 418 BC, the Orchomenians dared not offer resistance, and surrendered the hostages.

At the time of the foundation of Megalopolis, we find the Orchomenians exercising supremacy over Theisoa, Methydrium, and Teuthis; but the inhabitants of these cities were then transferred to Megalopolis, and their territories assigned to the latter. The Orchomenians, through their enmity to the Mantineians, refused to join the Arcadian confederacy, and made war upon the Mantineians. Henceforth, Orchomenus lost its political importance; but, from its commanding situation, its possession was frequently an object of the belligerent powers in later times.

In the war between Cassander and Polyperchon in 313 BC, it initially fell into the power of the former before being taken by Polyperchon's forces. In 303 BC, during his campaigns in the Peloponnese, Demetrius Poliorcetes launched an assault on Orchomenus. The city was then held by a garrison under Strombichus, who had been appointed by Polyperchon. When Strombichus refused to surrender and insulted Demetrius from the city walls, Demetrius responded by bringing up siege engines, breaching the defenses, and taking the city by storm. In the aftermath, Demetrius crucified Strombichus along with at least eighty others deemed hostile. However, he spared and absorbed approximately two thousand captured mercenaries into his own forces.

It subsequently espoused the side of the Aetolians, made an agreement with the Achaean League under a ruler named Nearchus around 234 BC, was taken by Cleomenes III in 229 BC with the acquiescence of the Aetolians, and was in 223 BC retaken by Antigonus Doson, who placed there a Macedonian garrison. Later, under Roman pressure, it was given back by Philip V to the Achaeans.

Strabo mentions it among the Arcadian cities, which had either disappeared, or of which there were scarcely any traces left; but this appears from Pausanias to have been an exaggeration. Pausanias (writing in the 2nd c. AD) mentions, amongst other monuments, that close to the city was a wooden statue of Artemis, enclosed in a great cedar tree, and hence called Cedreatis.

When the 19th century classicist William Smith visited the place the old city on the acropolis was in ruins and there were only some vestiges of the agora and the town walls.

== Monuments ==
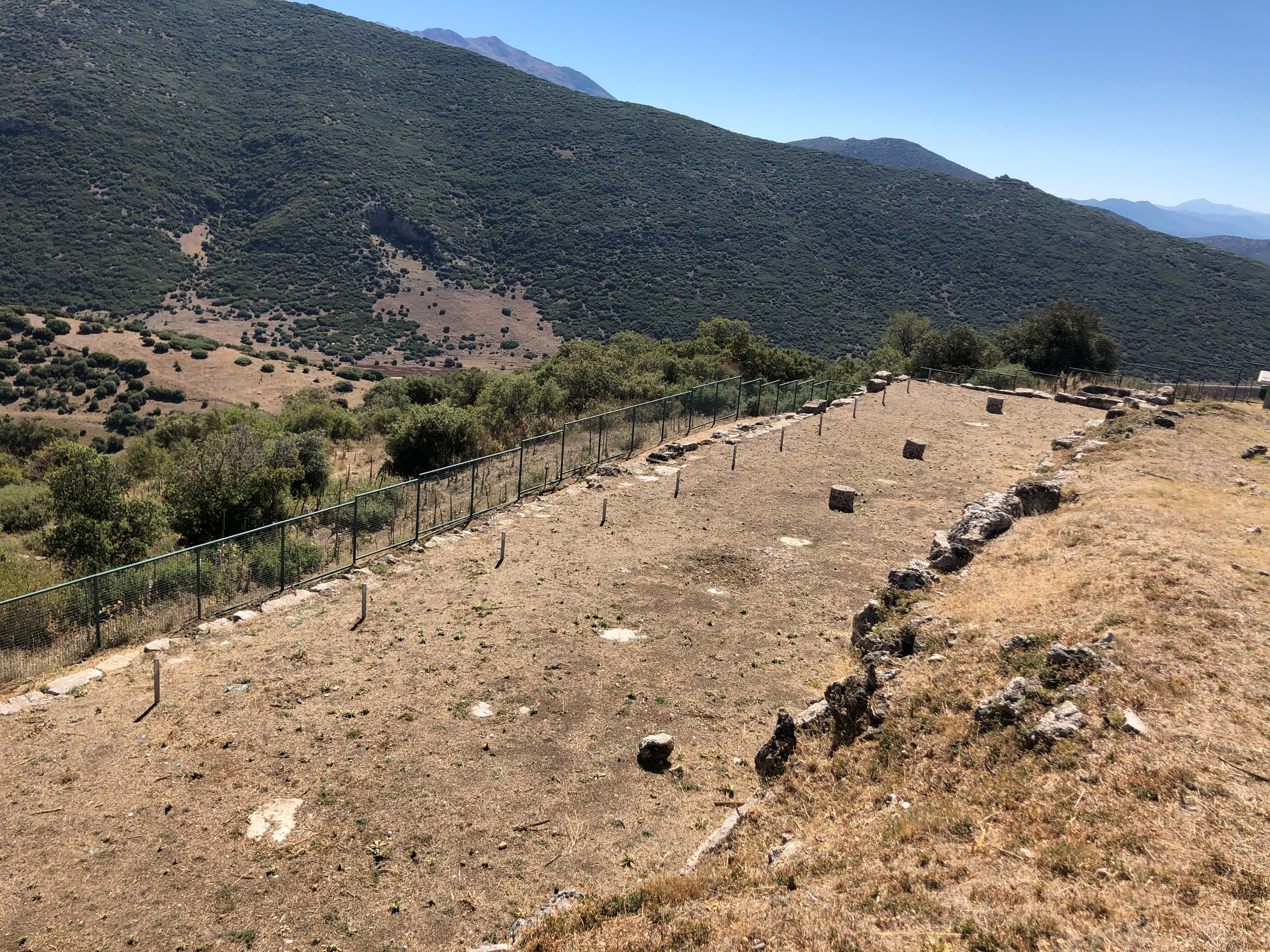
Orchomenos

Many monuments were revealed during the excavations and can be admired today including the theatre, the remains of the ancient agora, the city walls and the temple of Artemis Mesopolitis. Other monuments identified during the excavations are a Bouleuterion, a prehistoric tomb and a bridge of the Archaic Period.

The most important monument is the theatre (4th–3rd BC) with a capacity of 4,000. At an altitude of 800 metres it offered a spectacular view during cultural events.

Pausanias described the temples of Artemis and Poseidon as among the most remarkable monuments.

Approaching the town from the south one can see tumuli on the left, chiefly composed of collections of stones as described by Pausanias. Below the acropolis is the tomb of Aristocrates and beyond are the fountains called Teneiae (Τενεῖαι) which Pausanias mentions (writing in the 2nd c. AD) as one of the most remarkable objects in the place. A little further are the Hellenistic ruins of Amilus.

On the southern plain is an ancient canal which conducts the waters from the surrounding mountains through the ravine into the lower northern plain.

At Katalimata is a prehistoric settlement with prehistoric drainage facilities. At "Mytikas" Paleopyrgou there is a Mycenaean settlement and ancient sanctuary.

In the territory of Orchomenus on the northern slope of Mt. Anchisia was the temple of Artemis Hymnia which was held in high veneration by all the Arcadians in the most ancient times. Its site is probably indicated by a chapel of the Virgin Mary, which stands east of Levidi.

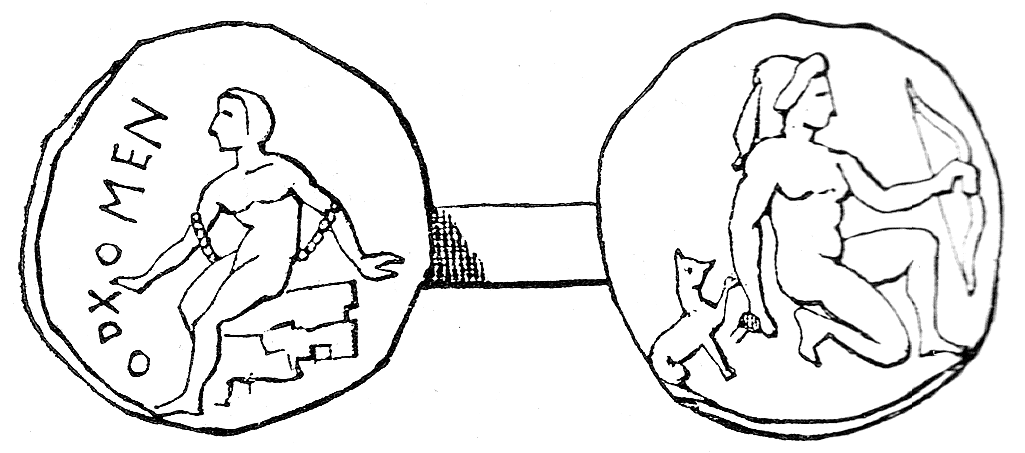
Coin from Orchomenus
