= Cesnola sphinx funerary stele =

Preserved funerary stele from 5th century BC Cyprus, part of the Cesnola Coll. at the MET

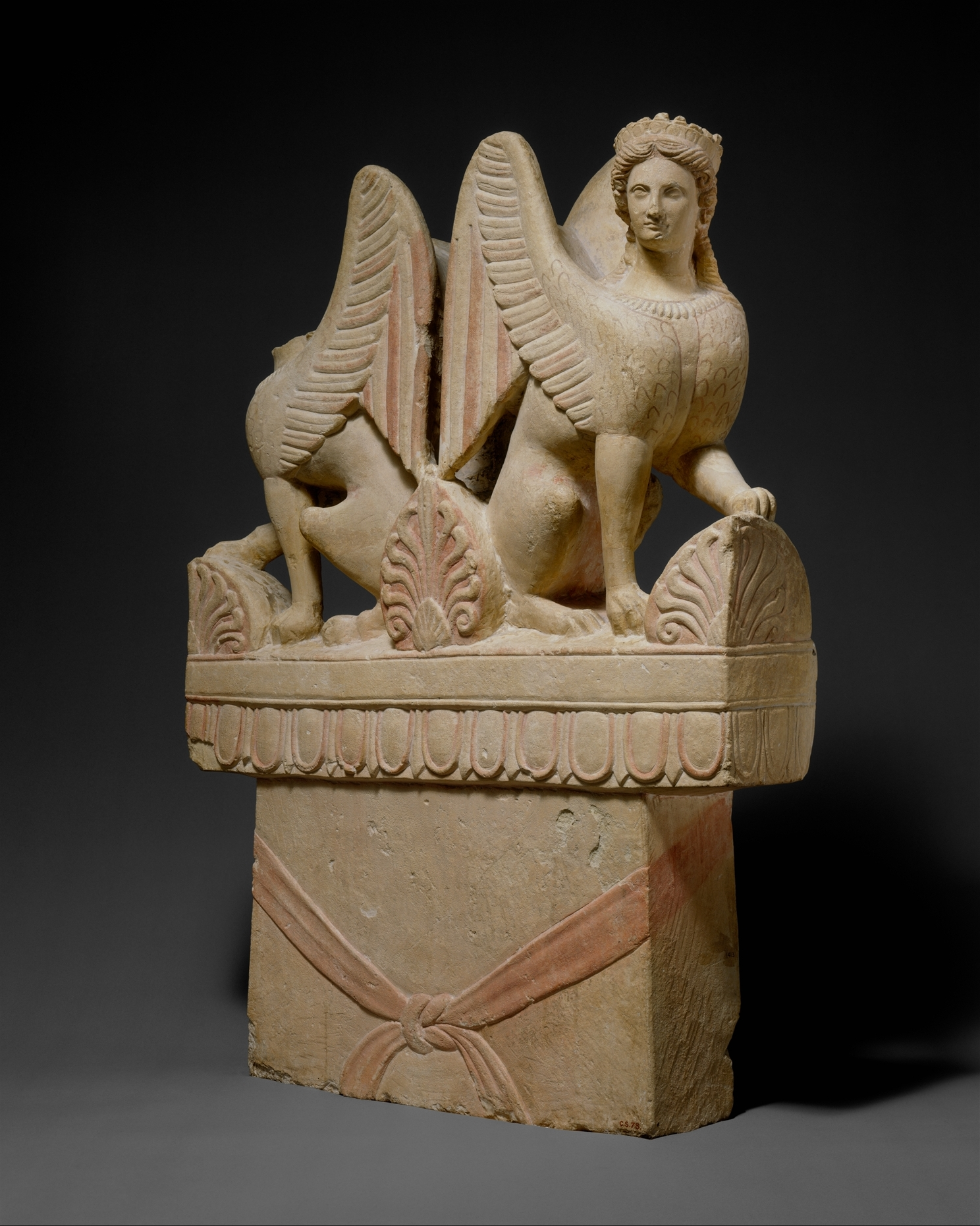
- Limestone funerary stele (shaft) surmounted by two sphinxes
- Material: Limestone
- Size: Overall: 34 3/4 x 26 15/16in. (88.2 x 68.5cm)
- Created: last quarter of the 5th century B.C.
- Period/culture: Classical Greece
- Discovered: 1860s–1870s Golgoi Necropolis, Cyprus
- Discovered by: Luigi Palma di Cesnola
- Place: Metropolitan Museum of Art
- Present location: New York City
- Identification: 74.51.2499
- Culture: Cypriot Greek

The Cesnola sphinx funerary stele is a Classic Greek funerary stela dating to the last quarter of the 5th century B.C.

It is part of the Cesnola Collection of the Metropolitan Museum of Art, a sub-section of the Department of Greek and Roman Art, named after the first director of the MET, Luigi Palma di Cesnola, whose collection is considered the museum's earliest and inaugural acquisition upon opening in Central Park in 1880.

Consisting of well over 6000 pieces, shipped on 275 crates, the stele, along with the collection served as a cornerstone for the study of Cypriot art, a crossroads of Assyrian, Phoenician, Egyptian, Greek, and Roman influences.

== Background and provenance ==
Luigi Palma di Cesnola was a Medal of Honor recipient in the American Civil War, with extensive military history in Europe as well.

His post-military career posted him as American Consul to Cyprus in 1865, where he conducted extensive excavations throughout the island.

The funerary stele was catalogued in 1874 and was officially acquired by the museum in 1874–1876. A report from 1907 about its restoration indicated that a restorationist who partnered with Cesnola, Charles Balliard, attempted to restore the missing head of the sphinx on the left with a head found right close by in situ of the cemetery, but it was subsequently deemed not a match to the stele.

The stele is catalogued as Cesnola No. 470, Myres 1413, and subsequently by its MET acquisition number 74.51.2499.

== Description ==
The sculpture consist of two sphinxes, with the left missing its head. Found in fragments initially, the stele was broken from side to side, along with the forelegs, which were subsequently repaired. The lower portion is decorated with a frieze of palmettes, egg, and dart, characteristic of 5th century BC style, with portions of the stele maintaining its original polychromy with red-brown pigment.

Both sphinxes are faced back to back, gazing out in three-quarters perspective. The intact sphinx has its hair intact and long, pulled back on the sides, but covering her ears, and wears a crown consisting of circles and merlons, the back of the stele is roughed out with its bottom half broken off.

The sphinx motif on the stele indicates its prominence in cult objects, as prior to the stele's approximate creation, in the mid 5th century BC, the depiction was also seen in the Amathus sarcophagus, considered the most significant object in the Cesnola collection alongside the stele, famous for its preserved polychromy.
