= Pausanias' description of Delphi =

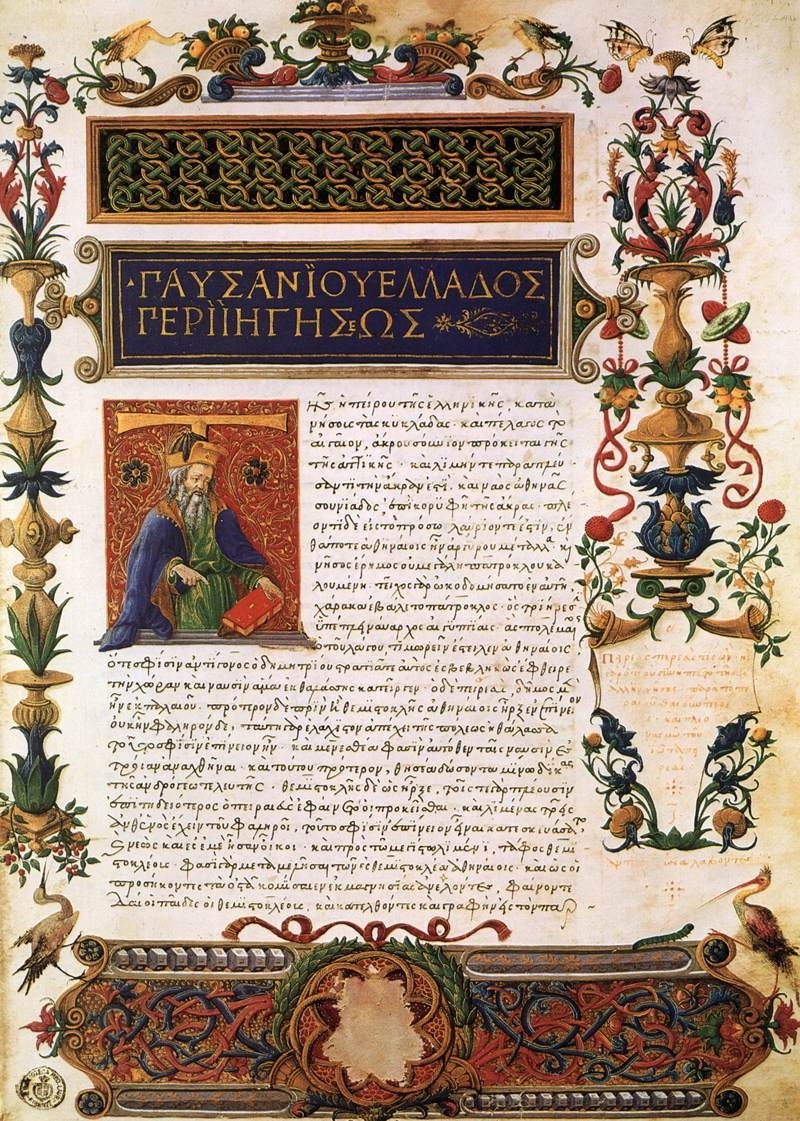
Manuscript of Pausanias' Description of Greece at the Laurentian Library in Florence

The tenth book of the work Description of Greece by the traveler Pausanias (2nd century AD) is dedicated to Phocis; its larger part constitutes a description of the sanctuaries and buildings of Delphi. His work constituted a precious aid to travelers and archaeologists who attempted to identify the monuments revealed by the excavations, although in some cases their identifications were not enough.

== Pausanias ==
A traveler and geographer of the 2nd century AD, Pausanias was most probably born in Lydia (Asia Minor) and wrote a very important work, the Description of Greece. It is a lengthy and detailed itinerary in ten books, describing the most important sites of the Peloponnese, Attica, Boeotia, and Phocis. According to the famous classicist James Frazer who wrote on Pausanias, "without him the ruins of Greece would be a labyrinth without a clue, a riddle without an answer". He was mainly interested in monuments (particularly sculpture and painting) as well as their historical framework and the cults.

== The tenth book ==
As in the rest of his books, in his description of Delphi Pausanias describes rituals, rites, customs and offers narrations with a historical and ethnographic background. Delphi are described in 38 chapters. The limit of his itinerary was the land of the Ozolian Locrians. The book was probably accomplished between 143 and 161 AD.

The detailed description of Pausanias was valuable to later scholarship and to the attempts at reconstructing the site. Although the treasures of Delphi had been looted by the Phoceans initially and by Roman emperors such as Nero later on, in Pausanias' times there were still enough monuments to admire and describe. He focuses on religious art and architecture. He is very detailed on the narration of the Oedipus myth, on the foundation of the oracle and temple of Apollo, on the Pythian Games and on the description of the ex votos. He also writes about historical events related to Delphi as well as about mythical events and scenes.

Of particular interest and value is the description of the Iliou Persis (Fall of Troy), the painting by Polygnotus which used to decorate the Lesche of the Cnidians. He describes in detail the composition and many attempts at modern reconstructions have been based on this description.

The description of the site of Delphi has the following structure:

=== Sanctuary of Athena Pronaia ===
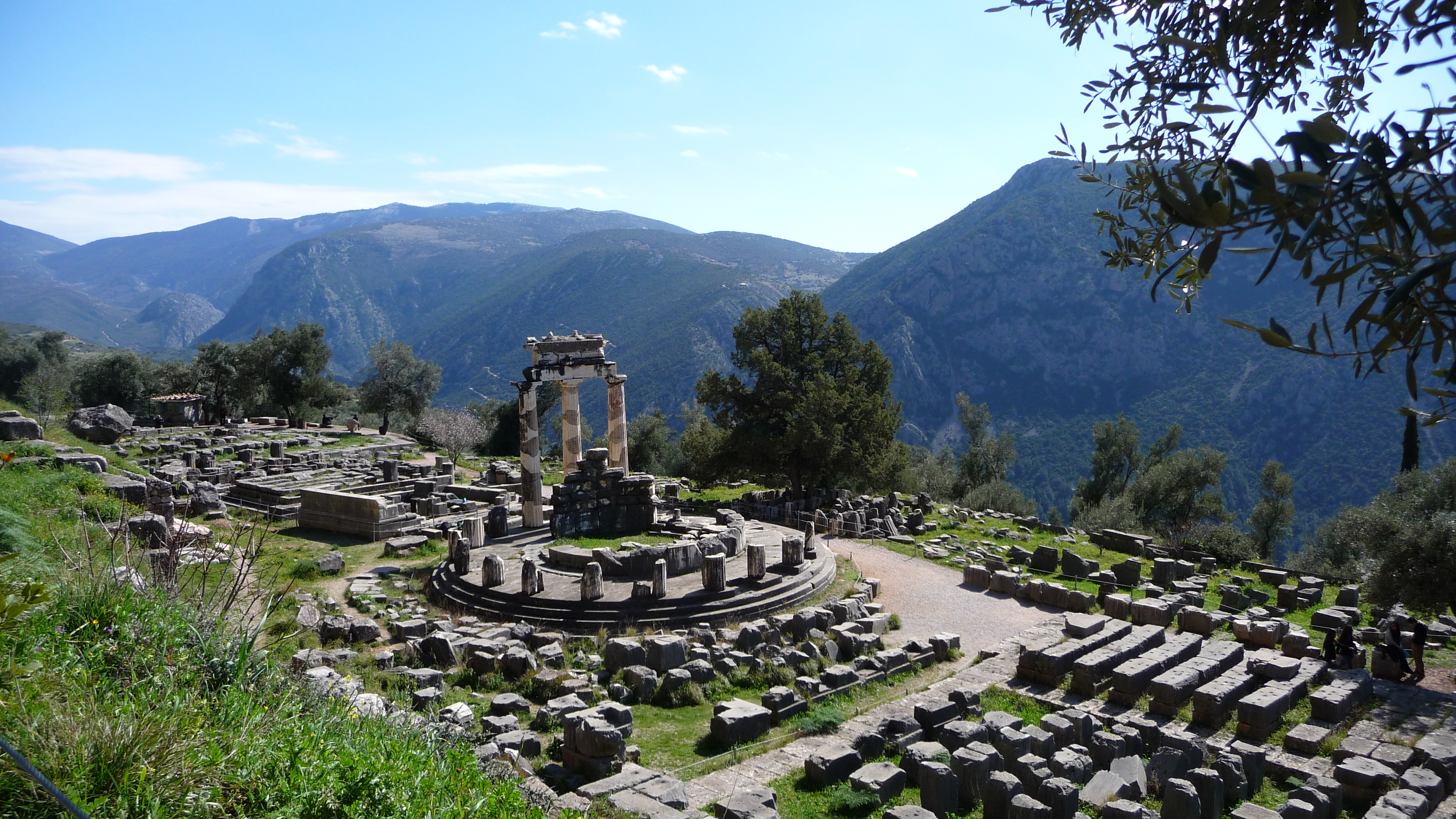
The Sanctuary of Athena Pronaia, including the Delphic Tholos

Pausanias mentions that in the Sanctuary of Athena Pronaia existed three temples (two of them empty of ex votos and statues), as well as a fourth one with a few statues of Roman emperors. He also mentions the Treasury of the Massaliots but, strangely enough, he does not mention the Tholos of Delphi, which had suffered damage from a fire in the 1st century BC, nor the Doric Treasury. He also mentions that next to the sanctuary lay a temple dedicated to the local hero Phylakos.

Yet, the picture which emerged from the excavations does not converge with Pausanias' testimony. For several years this divergence puzzled the scholars until in 1985 Didier Laroche proposed a new reading of Pausanias. This new interpretation was based on the fact that Pausanias followed a different itinerary than the usual one, whereas the Tholos could be "the temple hosting small number of portraits of Roman Emperors". In general, the picture offered by Pausanias is that of a sanctuary in decline, with buildings that did not attract large number of visitors and was generally not very well kept (a fact stressed also by Plutarch, who mentions that in his days the funds of the sanctuary were limited and thus the conservation and repair works were few and far between).

=== The Gymnasium and Castalia fountain ===
Pausanias refers to the Gymnasium, but he seems to be particularly interested in the myths related to the Castalia fountain and to the abundant waters of the region in general.

=== The Sanctuary of Apollo ===
The ex voto of Phayllos of Croton from Croton (the base of the ex voto of the Crotoniats) mentioned by Pausanias was identified for years with the preserved base with an inscription mentioning the Crotoniats, but it has been proved now that this base belonged to another ex voto offered by the citizens of Croton for their victory over the Sybarites (510 BC).

The Bull of the Corcyreans was a large bronze ex voto of the citizens of Corfu in order to thank the god for an enormous catch of tuna fish made possible through a bull which averted them. He then goes on to describe the base of the Arcadians for their victory against the Lacaedemonians, the monument of Lysandros, the Lacaedemonian general for his victory against Athens, an impressive ex voto with the Dioskouroi, several gods, Lysandros himself, Agias who was his counsellor and some of his allies.

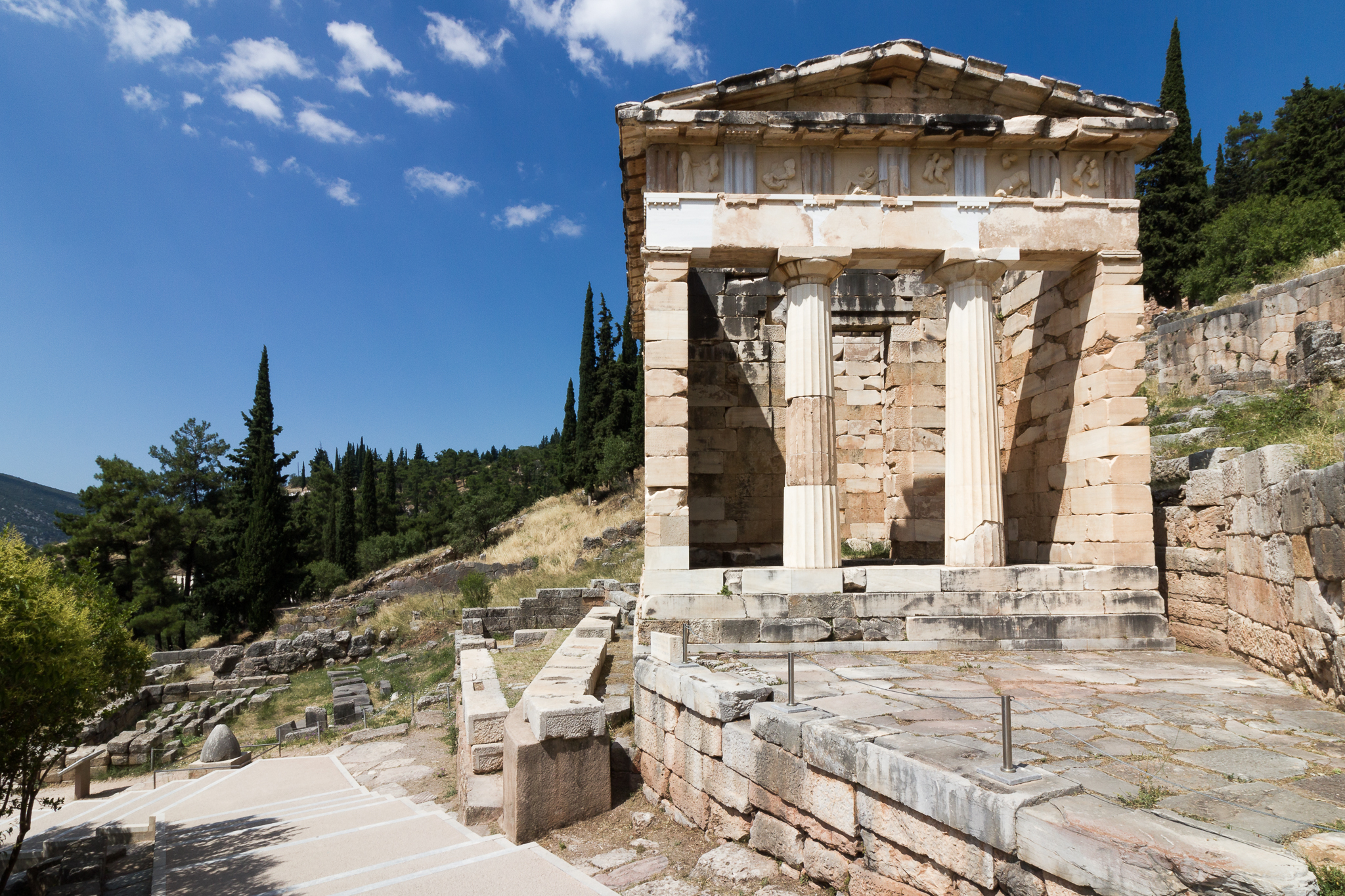
The reconstructed Athenian Treasury, built to commemorate the Athenians' victory at the Battle of Marathon.

Pausanias also mentions that the Athenians, with the tithe from the booty of the Battle of Marathon, had dedicated an ex voto comprising the statues of Athena, Apollo, Miltiades and the mythical kings of Athens. Similar was also the ex voto of the Argives, which comprised their leaders who had followed Polynikes at the war of the Seven against Thebes.

Then, Pausanias mentions the base of the Tarentines, who had dedicated bronze horses and statues of women in captivity, in order to commemorate their victory against the Messapians. He goes on to describe the treasuries, starting from the Sicyonian Treasury and continuing with the Siphnian, Theban, Athenian, and Cnidian treasuries. In between he describes also the base of the sculpted ex voto of the Cnidians as well as the ex voto of the Lipareans. It is obvious that he was mostly attracted by sculpture and less by architecture. However, he is most detailed in his description of the Stoa of the Athenians, whereas he pays special mention to the Sibyl rock, an outcrop of rock between the Athenian Treasury and the Stoa of the Athenians.

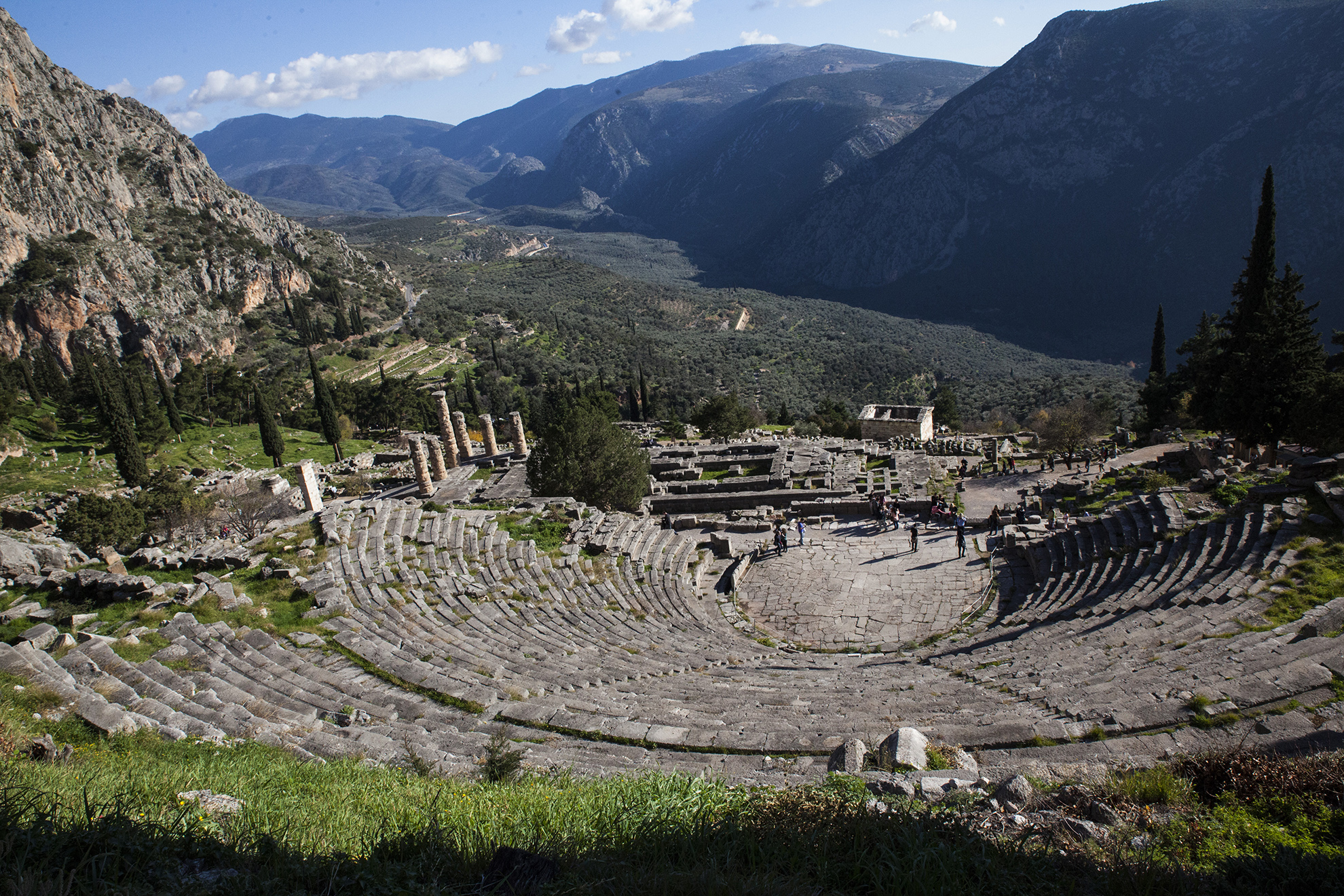
The theatre at Delphi

In chapters 14 and 15 he returns to his favourite sculpture, enumerating several statues which would nowadays be completely unknown, among which Apollo of Salamis and the statue of Phryne, made by Praxiteles. He then writes about the omphalos, which he describes made of white marble. It is, however, not very clear which is actually the omphalos he describes. He includes a series of smaller statues and ex votos, also lost today.

After a lengthy narration of the attacks of the Gauls against Delphi, he goes on to describe the Temple of Apollo. He describes the representations on the pediments and the interior of the temple, speaking about the altar of Poseidon. Very detailed is also the description of the Lesche of the Knidians and particularly, as mentioned above, of the painting of the "Capture of Troy" by Polygnotus. Finally, Pausanias refers to the Stadium and the Theatre of Delphi, with which he finished the description of the sanctuary.

== Gallery ==
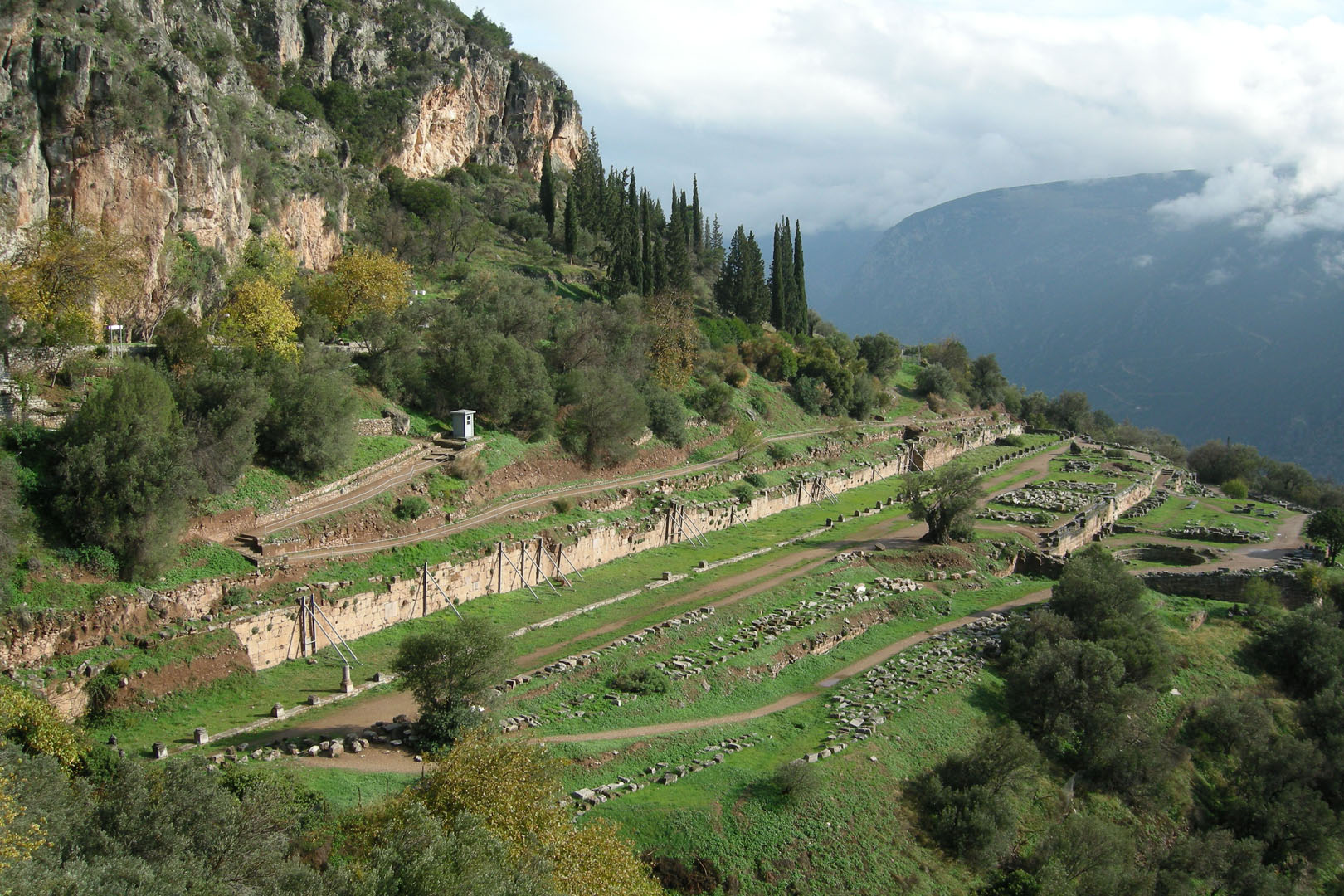
The ancient Gymnasium at Delphi

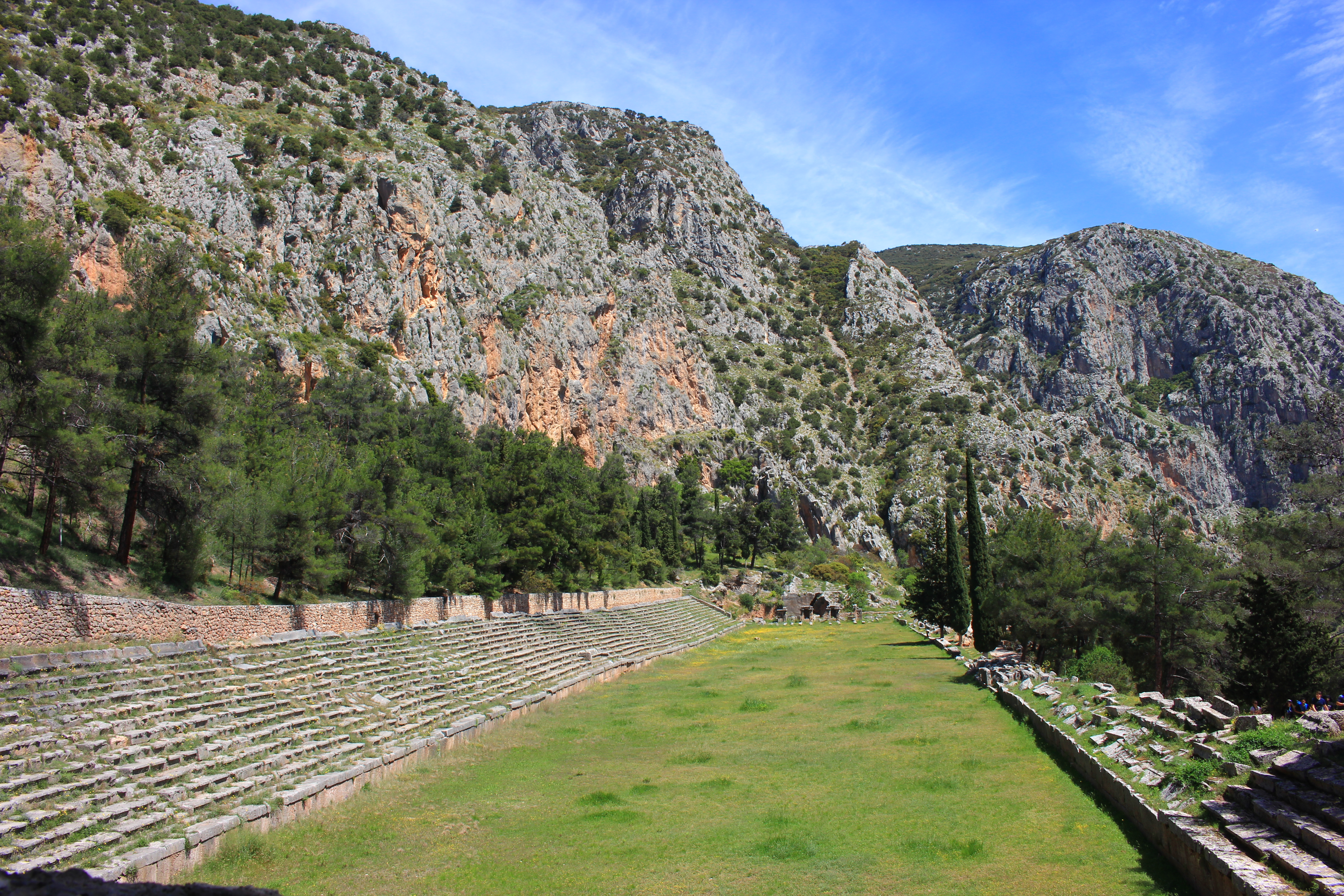
The mountain-top Stadium of Delphi

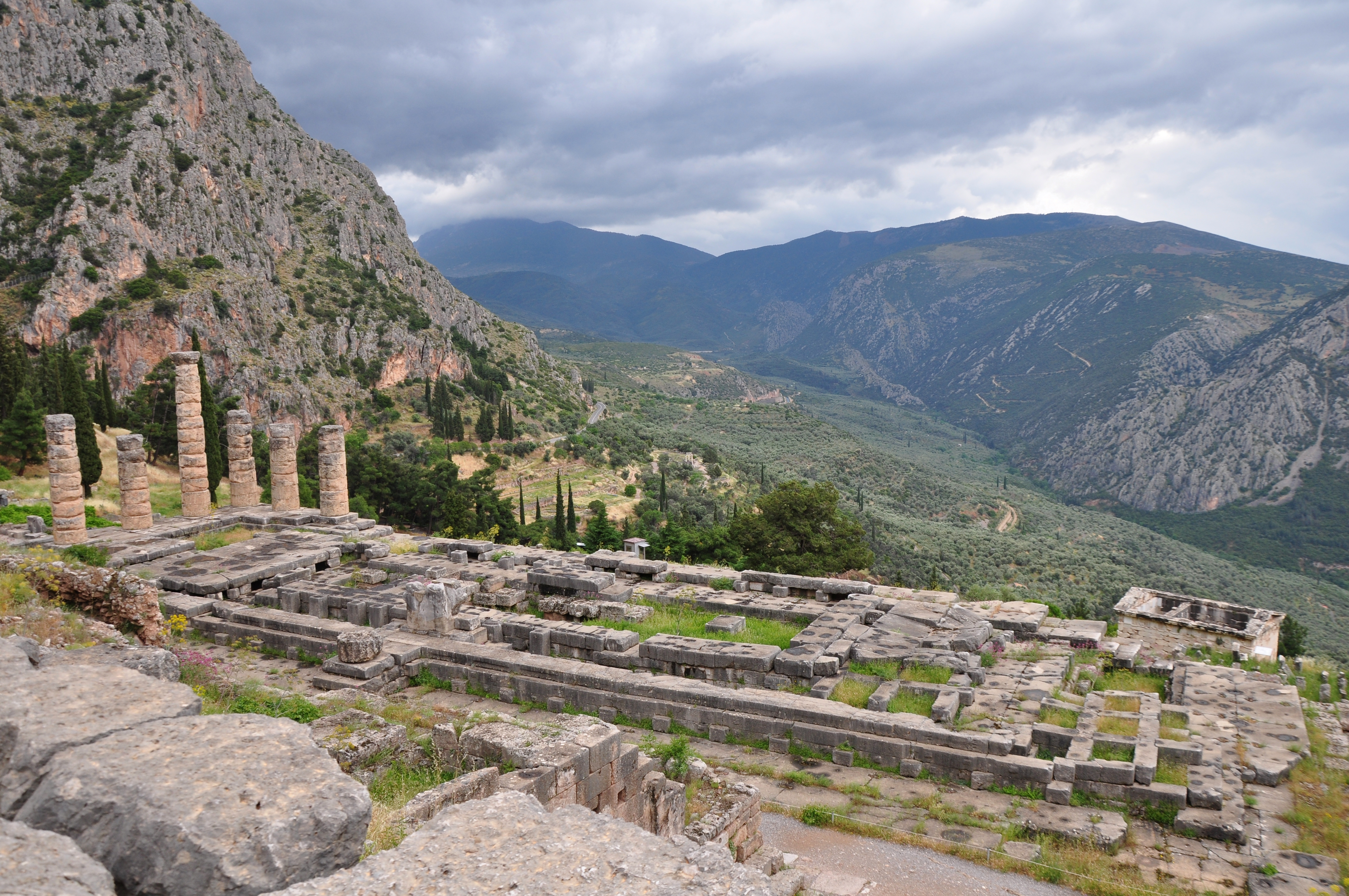
The Temple of Apollo

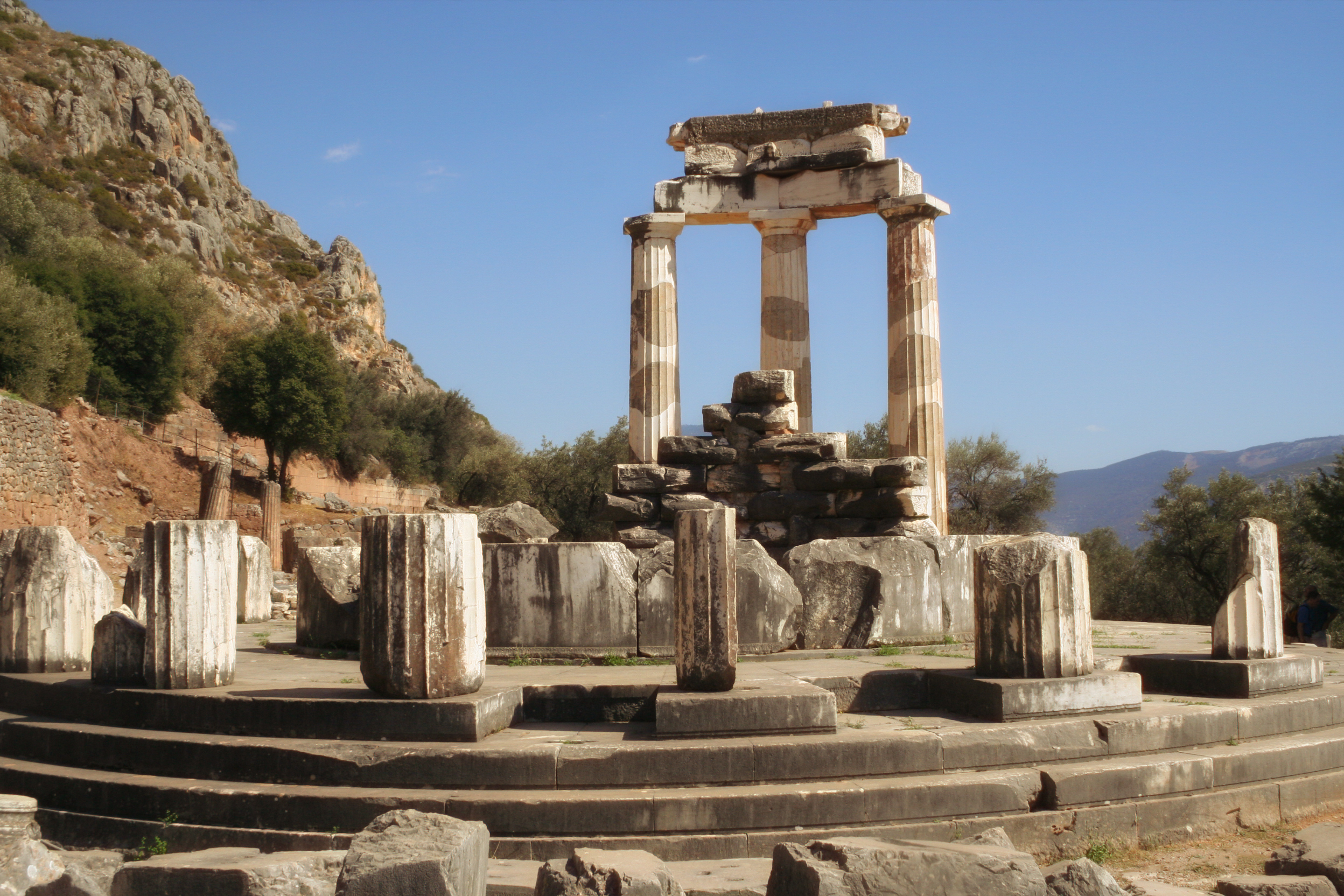
The Tholos of Delphi

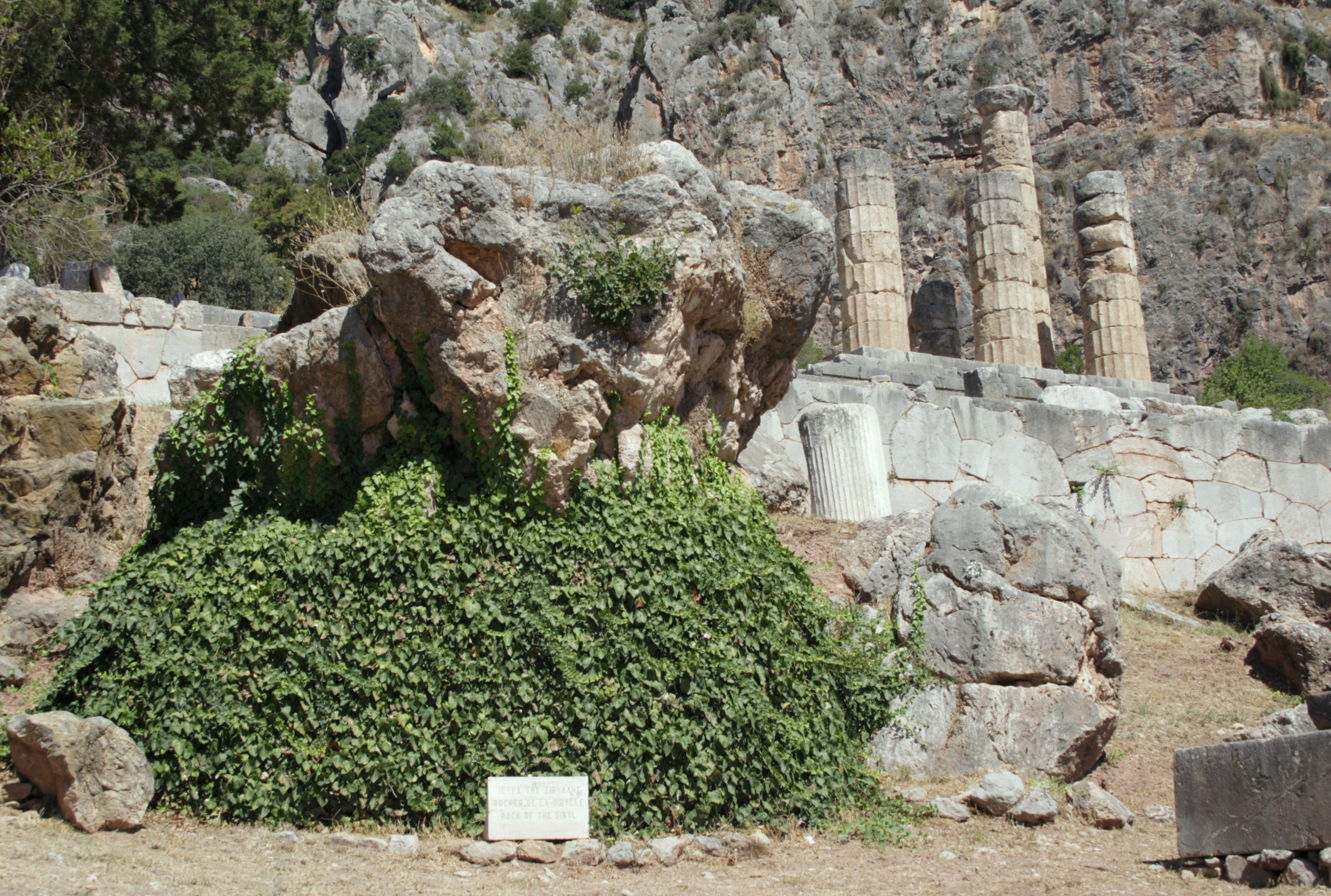
The Sibyl rock

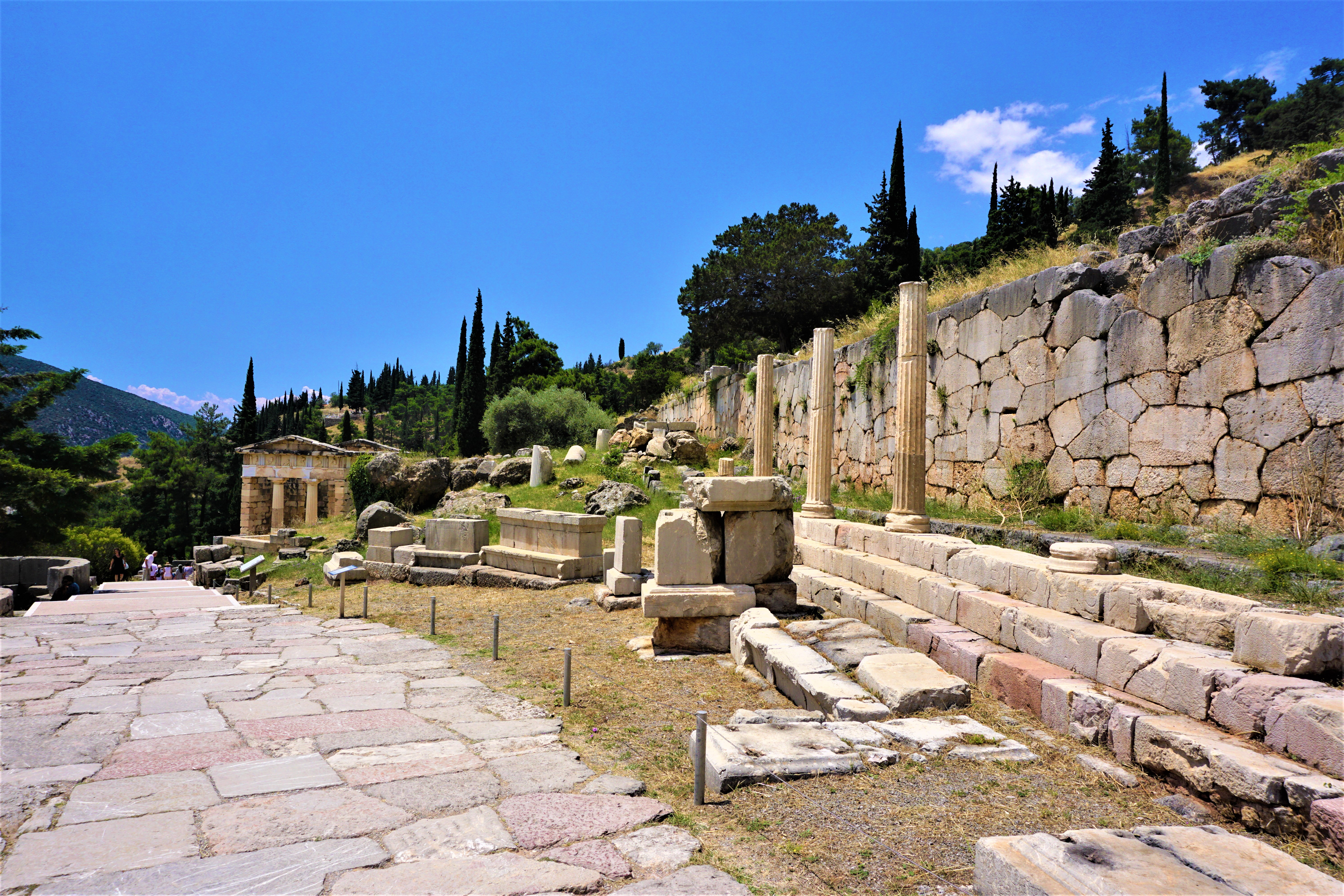
The Stoa of the Athenians

== See also ==
- Excavations at Delphi

== Bibliography ==
- Fouilles de Delphes, École Française d'Athènes, depuis 1902.
- Daux,G. (1936) Pausanias à Delphes, Paris:Picard
- Pouilloux, J., Roux, G., (1963) Énigmes à Delphes, Paris:de Boccard
- Bommelaer, J.-Fr., Laroche, D. (1991) Guide de Delphes, Le site, Paris:de Boccard
