= Cnidian Treasury =

Sanctuary of Apollo in Delphi

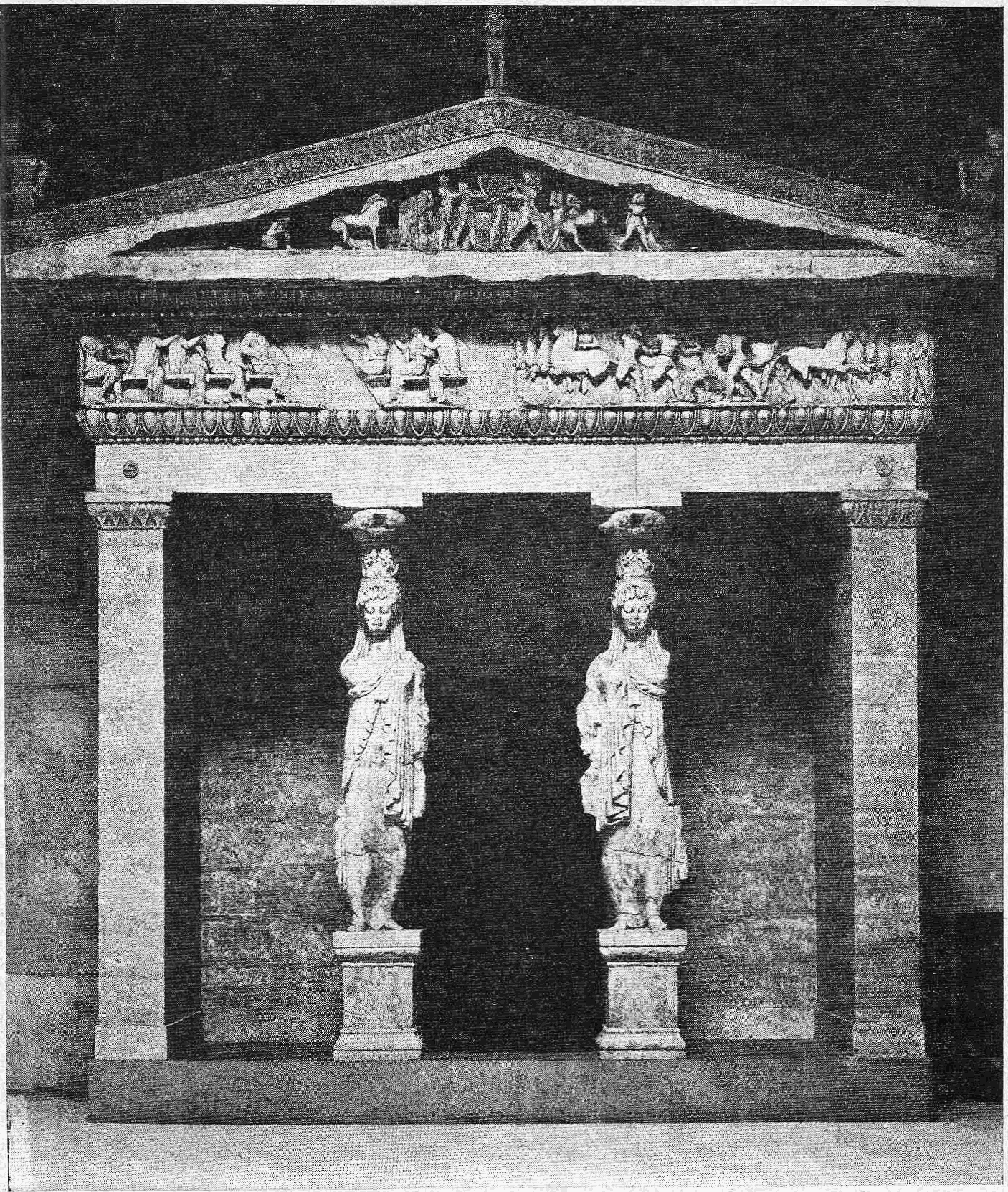
Cnidian Treasury

Cnidus was represented at the Sanctuary of Apollo in Delphi by the Treasury of the Cnidians of the late Archaic period and by a late Classical period building, called "Lesche", a kind of club for social gatherings.

== Description ==
The remains of the Treasury of the Cnidians are situated just next to the Sacred Way close to the Siphnian Treasury to which they bear resemblance, to the exception of the smaller size.

It was a marble building, erected before Cnidus was conquered by the Persians in 544 B.C. Its features remind of the mid-sixth century B.C. The treasury was built in the Ionian order, prostyle, but there is not much information on the exact plan of its elevation and the roof. It is possible that there were korae (Caryatids) on the façade instead of plain columns. At the time of the Great Excavation it was thought that the friezes and sculpted decoration of the Siphnian Treasury actually originated from the Treasury of the Cnidians, a misinterpretation which led archaeologists to overestimate its artistic and aesthetic value. Pausanias described the monument but was puzzled by its architrave inscription: what he failed to notice was that it was written "boustrophedon", i.e. from left to right and from right to left. The inscription bears a dedication of the building to the Pythian Apollo. Apart from the main inscription, its walls and antae bear about sixty more inscriptions, mostly honorary decrees and manumission acts, as well as two decrees of a fiscal character, quite enlightening on the finances of the time.
