= Lesche (disambiguation) =

Lesche is an ancient Greek word meaning council or conversation.

Lesche or Lesches may also refer to:

== People ==
- Lesches (7th century), early Greek poet
- Verné Lesche (1917–2002), Finnish speed skater

== Places ==
- Lesches, Seine-et-Marne, French commune
- Lesches-en-Diois, French village and commune
- Lesche of the Knidians, a former meeting room within the sanctuary of Apollo, Delphi, Greece

== See also ==
- Leschea (fl. 1990s), R&B performer
