= Agias of Sparta =

5th-century Spartan seer

Agias (Gr. Ἀγίας), the son of Agelochus and grandson of Tisamenus of Elea, was the Spartan seer of Lysander, who predicted that general's victory at the battle of Aegospotami in 404 BC. Some ancient writers considered Agias' prediction—that Lysander would capture the entire fleet except for ten triremes (which fled to Corcyra)--to have been the cause of the victory more than a mere prediction. Pausanias mentions seeing a bronze statue of Agias at the altar of Augustus in the marketplace in Sparta. There was also a statue in Delphi of both Agias and Lysander, reputedly erected by Lysander, which has been partially recovered, at the ex voto of the Lacaedemonians. It was a rectangular exedra; in the Sanctuary of Apollo, on the northern side of the Sacred Way, west of the Bull of the Corcyreans. Dated ca. 403 BC.

== Recognition ==
With spoils from the recent victory at Aigospotamoi, Lysander commanded statues be built for his military commanders. This was the first time in the history of Sparta that statues of living military commanders were created. There were approximately 39 statues created, the 9 in the front row included Lysander himself, immediately next to him were the statues of Agias, and Hermon, the commander of his Flagship. The statue of Agias is somewhat unique in that it was the only one created by Pison of Kalaureia.
