= Excavations at Delphi =

Archaeological investigations in Greece

Academic investigations at the sacred precinct of Delphi in central Greece started in the second half of the 19th century. In 1892 a systematic archaeological excavation began under the direction of Théophile Homolle and the French Archaeological School of Athens. This "Great Excavation" (La Grande Fouille) lasted ten years and concluded with the establishment of a museum on the site. The site continued to be excavated and several of the monuments have been restored.

== Abandonment of the precinct ==
Over the course of the 5th and 6th centuries AD, the sanctuary of Apollo was absorbed into the urban Roman settlement that grew on the abandoned precinct, centred around an agora as the commercial hub. The Athena sanctuary was used as a reliable quarry for centuries for building new homes; by contrast, the grounds of the Apollo sanctuary was slowly occupied by houses and the altar at the front of the temple was dismantled. Thermae (baths) were built in the northwestern part of the temple grounds and the treasures around the sanctuary were turned into more utilitarian buildings. At least three basilicae, the earliest of which can be dated to no later than AD 450, were eventually constructed at Delphi and fused Christian imagery with elements of Delphi's mythology such as snake worship. The re-use of stones helped maintain ancient motifs—such as the acanthus—in the new town.

In the second half of the 6th century, the area of Delphi began to become depopulated with the abandonment of houses, cisterns, and the surrounding countryside, possibly as a consequence of the Justinian plague. The Slavic migrations to the Balkans in the early 7th century caused devastation across Greece and, after a feeble defense, Delphi was finally abandoned.

== The rediscovery of Delphi ==
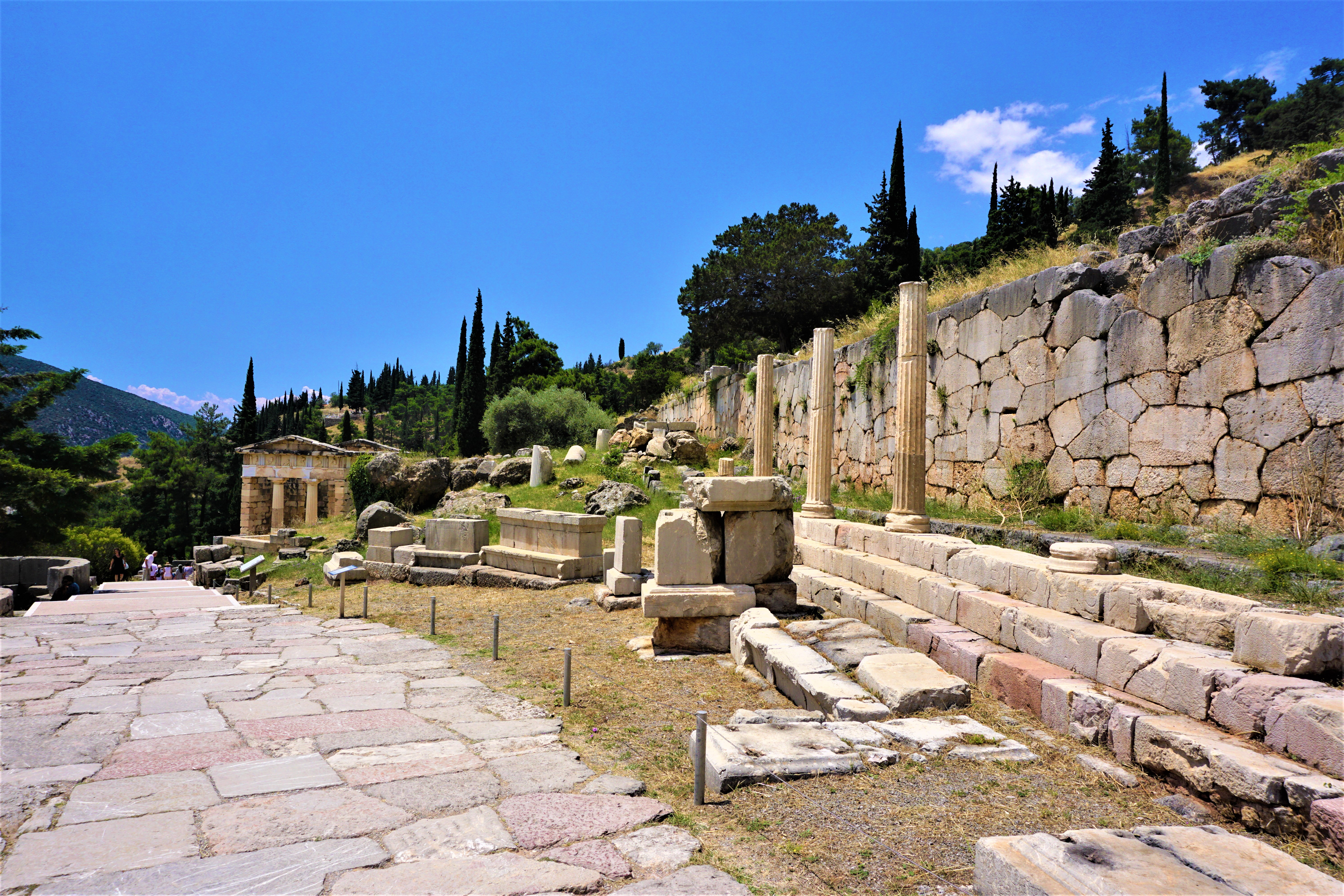
The Stoa of the Athenians

In the course of the Ottoman period the archaeological site of Delphi was often visited by European travelers. The first person known to have rediscovered Delphi was the antiquarian and classical scholar Cyriacus of Ancona on 21 March 1436. Cyriacus, a native of the maritime republic of Ancona on the Italian Peninsula, spent six days in the mountains in a village by then no longer known as "Delphi" but as Kastri.

After Cyriacus, English architects James "Athenian" Stuart and Nicholas Revett visited Delphi in 1751, shortly after the uncovering of Herculaneum and Pompeii. Their investigations uncovered part of an enormous stone wall which supported the temple's terrace. The wall was covered in inscriptions, and its stones were too large to dislodge by hand.

Greece won its independence in 1829 following its defeat of the Ottoman Empire in the Greek War of Independence. The First Hellenic Republic lacked the resources to conduct archaeological investigations or manage the re-location of a village. An earthquake in 1870 left the village derelict, resulting in the opportunity for excavations at Delphi to proceed. In 1880, French archaeologists began excavating the Stoa of the Athenians.

== The Great Excavation ==
Under Charilaos Trikoupis the Greek state began the process of modernization and long-term planning. A close collaboration between France and Greece was achieved, part of which was in the field of cultural heritage and archaeology. Thus, in 1892, under the auspices of the French Archaeological School of Athens, the "Great Excavation" (La Grande Fouille) began. Great, not only in length of time, but also in what regarded the extent, the difficulty, the number of people who were mobilized and, of course, the number and importance of the monuments and finds discovered. The diary of this amazing effort has been digitized by the School, offering a glimpse at the fascinating and copious efforts of the archaeological team, which comprised members of various nationalities.

The entire village of Kastri was transferred to the location where now lies the village of Delphi. The technical teams provided the site with a Decauville railway with V skip wagonets, in order to remove the debris, and started demolishing the old houses. After all the preparatory work, the actual excavation started in mid-October 1892, quite late in autumn, and therefore it did not last for long. The next season, however, started in April 1893, revealing large part of the Athenian Treasury as well as the Sibyl rock and the Altar of the Chians. Within the next years came to light most of the buildings along the Sacred Way as well as unique sculptures. One of the most exciting moments was the discovery of the Charioteer, part of the monumental bronze sculpture dedicated by the tyrant of Gela, Polyzalos, in order to commemorate his victory at the Pythian Games. Other highlights of the excavations were the discovery of the Dancers of Delphi as well as of the Roman statue of Antinous and of the pair of archaic kouroi (Dioskouroi or Kleobis and Biton). After revealing the monuments within the sanctuary of Apollo the archaeologists started excavating the stadium and the gymnasium and then moved on to the so-called "Marmaria", i.e. the sanctuary of Athena Pronaia, from where the locals used to pick building material for centuries.

The team of the archaeologists comprised several big names of French scholarship, such as the director Th. Homolle, the architect A. Tournaire, Henri Corvet, P. Perdrizet, and academics such as Th. Reinach and H. Weil, who undertook the study and enhancement of the epigraphic material. However, it was not a solely French, but rather an international team, as it comprised also scholars of other nationalities, notably Greek and German.

== From finds to exhibits: the Museum of Delphi ==
=== The inauguration of the first museum ===
On 2 May 1903 the Great Excavation was accomplished triumphantly with the inauguration of the Delphi Archaeological Museum, which was going to host the finds. The construction of the museum was enabled by a trust created by the Greek politician and benefactor Andreas Syngros. The inauguration of the museum was an event of international calibre as a number of highly acclaimed personalities in the field of culture and diplomacy were present. The museum was built on croquis designed by the French architect of the excavations Α. Tournaire. The museographic approach of Th. Homolle, based on the use of cast copies of architectural members, in order to demonstrate the sculptures "in context", was soon judged outdated.

=== The second generation (1903–1939) ===
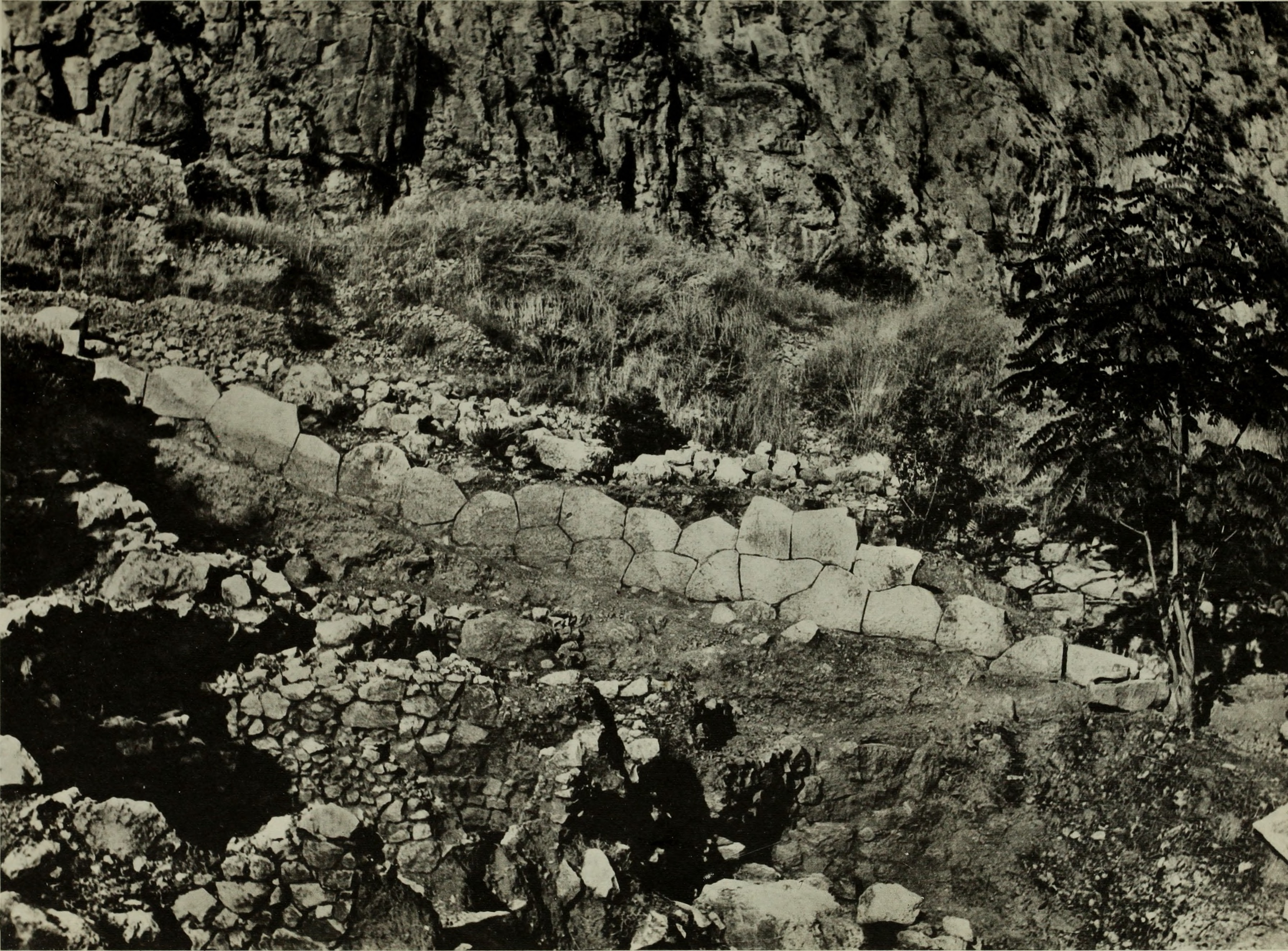
The polygonal wall, 1902

In the course of the next thirty years several prominent Greek and foreign archaeologists and researchers worked at Delphi: Keramopoulos, Meliadis and Romaeos, Van Effenterre, Jannoray, Georges Daux and the nobleman Pierre de La Coste-Messelière counted among them. They proposed new identifications and a totally new perspective of the exhibition, which necessitated a remodeling of the museum. They finally started pressing for the creation of a new museum.

=== The second museum ===
This museum was inaugurated in 1939. The antiquities were placed according to a chronological order and the plaster casts were removed. This exhibition, however, was going to be a particularly difficult one: the outbreak of World War II led the authorities to have the antiquities buried or to transfer them to Athens. Among these antiquities were the ones discovered on that same year under the Sacred Way, within a dump which had been used in antiquity for burying precious sacred ex votos destroyed by fire or other causes; among these finds counted the Chryselephantine statues, the silver bull, the bronze Pair of athletes and the Incense burner in the form of Peplophoros. The museum didn't open again until after 1950, because Delphi remained a military zone throughout the Greek Civil War.

== The third phase of the museum ==
By 1956 it was evident that the museum needed an extension. The existing building was refurbished and enlarged by the architect Patroclos Karantinos. The new museographic approach was the result of the collaboration of the Ephore of Antiquities of Delphi Ioanna Konstantinou and of Christos Karouzos, director of the National Archaeological Museum. The new Delphi Museum opened its gates in 1961, at the time when the economic and cultural regeneration of Greece started bringing loads of foreign tourists to the site.

=== The Sacred Way ===
The route identified on many tourist maps as the Sacred Way is a zigzagging stone path through the grounds to the temple terrace. However this was not original to Delphi, as there were many paths that led to and from different levels of the temple's different terrace levels. The pathway was constructed in modern times with reused pieces of stone from around the Apollo sanctuary.

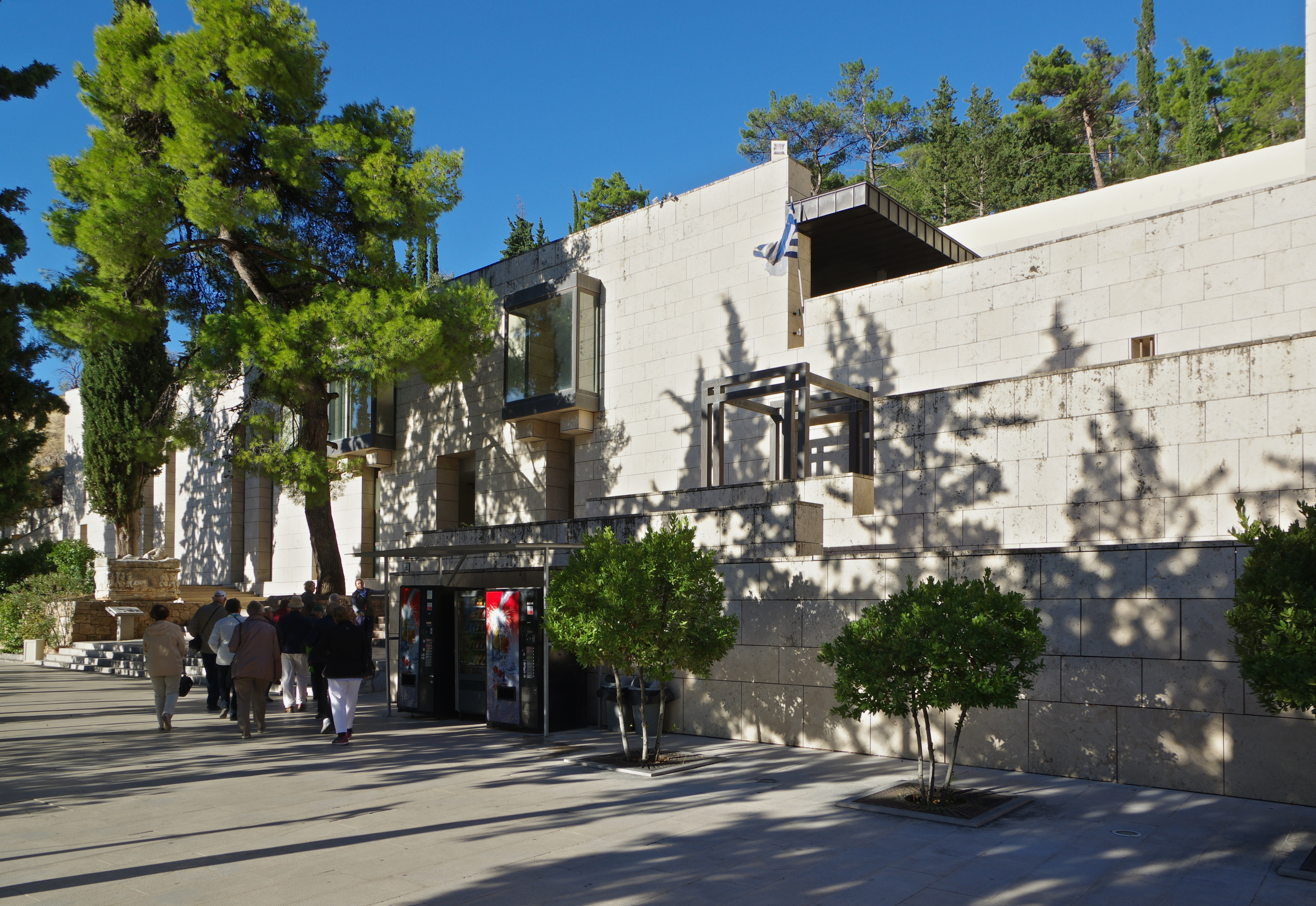
The Delphi Archaeological Museum

== The 21st century museum ==
Finally, one century after the first inauguration of the museum a new exhibition took place, aiming at the enhancement of some of the exhibits, such as the Charioteer and the gold and ivory statues as well as at the compatibility of the museological approach with the new scholarly conclusions stemming from the ongoing study of the objects. As Rozina Kolonia, former Ephor of Antiquities of Delphi, notes in the guidebook of the museum, the exhibits are displayed in a way that they "compose a historical novel, the pages of which run across twelve centuries of history and archaeology: they narrate through museography the political, religious and artistic activity of the most renowned sanctuary of paganism and of its oracle."

== Bibliography ==
- Jacquemin, A. (ed), 2000, Delphes Cent Ans après la Grande fouille. Essai de bilan. Actes du colloque organisé par l'EFA, 17-20 septembre 1992, BCH supplément 36
- Kolonia, R., 2006, The archaeological museum of Delphi, Athens
- Hellman, M.-C., Skorda, D. (et al.)(1992), La redécouverte de Delphes, Paris
