= Temple of Athena Pronaia =

Ancient Greek temple at Delphi, Greece

- Ναός της Αθηνάς Προναίας (Greek)
- Location within Greece
- 38°28′49″N 22°30′29″E
- Type: Archaeological site
- Location: Ancient Delphi
- Region: Municipality of Delphi
- Part of: Phocis

History
- Built: 7th century BC
- Abandoned: 4th or 5th century

Site notes
- Material: Grey limestone
- Elevation: 592 m (1,942 ft)
- Architectural style: Doric temple
- Condition: Mainly foundations but several culumns are standing.

The Temple of Athena Pronaia was a temple at the ancient site of Delphi, in the Sanctuary of Athena Pronaia, a group of buildings comprising temples and treasuries as well as the famous Tholos of Delphi. There were in fact three successive temples built at the site. The earlier temples (38°28′49″N 22°30′30″E), referred to as A and B, were built in the 7th and 6th centuries BC respectively and were made of porous stone; a third temple (38°28′49″N 22°30′28″E) was built of limestone in the 4th century BC, although it is not certain that it actually was dedicated to Athena this time.

== Description ==
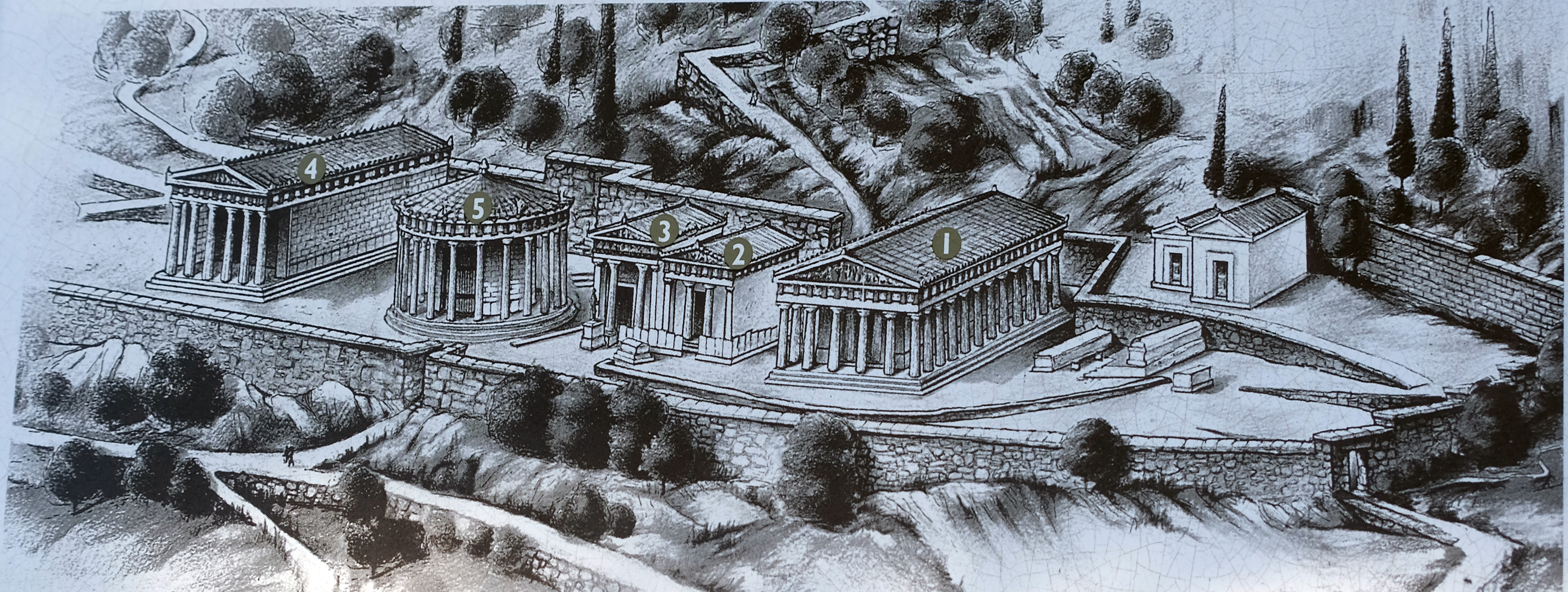
Reconstruction of the site

Plan of the Temple of Athena Pronaia in Delphi. 1 Temple of Athena Pronaia (showing later plan, here called B) 2 Newer temple (of Athena Pronaia?, here called C) 3 Tholos 4 Treasury of Massilians and Romans 5 Doric Treasury 6 Temenos of heroes 7 Altar of Athena Pronaia 8 Altar of Hygieia and Eileithyia 9 Unidentified archaic altar 10 Unidentified building (for priests?) 11 Statue base for the statue of emperor Hadrian? 12 Eastern entrance 13 Southern entrance

The sanctuary of Athena "Pronaia" (also spelled Pronaea, meaning 'the one before' the temple of Apollo), was the first one met by the visitor who came to Delphi on foot from the eastern road, hence its name.

Excavations have proved that at this spot lay an older cult site, possibly dedicated to Gaia (i.e., the Earth). Most of the Mycenaean figurines exhibited in the Delphi Archaeological Museum, including the notable seated figure on a tripod, were discovered here, and it has been suggested that they were ex-votos.

=== Temple A ===
The first temple dedicated to Athena was made of grey-shaded porous stone and was constructed in the 7th century BC. It was probably the earliest Doric temple, of which twelve columns have been preserved, along with the foundations and the crepidoma and stylobate. The columns were crowned by low capitals and bore shallow flutings.

In the first half of the 6th century BC, this temple was destroyed, possibly by an earthquake.

=== Temple B ===
After the destruction of temple A another temple, now called temple B, was erected on the same spot. The date of its construction is estimated at c. 510 BC, and it probably formed part of the building program of the Alcmaeonids for the restoration of the monuments of Delphi.

This second temple (13.25 × 27.46 m) was also made of porous stone. It did not have an opisthodomos; its pteron consisted of 12 columns on the long sides and 6 columns on the narrow ones. Its metopes were made of clay, decorated with figures; the pediments and acroteria also bore figures, such as Athena (pediment) and Nike (side acroteria).

The temple was excavated towards the end of the "Grande Fouille". Fifteen columns were still standing in 1905, when a rock fall destroyed them. Scholars think that perhaps this second temple was never actually destroyed or abandoned but continued to function after the construction of the third temple.

The marble fragments of a head of Athena discovered and displayed now at the museum are attributed to the cult statue of Athena, which would have been situated in the cella of the temple.

== Temple C ==
A third temple, built of limestone in the 4th c. BC, was possibly not dedicated to Athena, but rather to Artemis. Scholars are led to this supposition by the testimony of Pausanias, who mentions that one of the temples in the sanctuary of Pronaea was dedicated to Artemis. However, the traditional view remains in favour of Athena.

Its construction is dated to ca. 360 BC, and it was located at the west of the terrace supporting the entire complex of the "Marmaria". Although only the foundations are extant, its plan has been fully restored: it was based on a crepidoma consisting of three levels and had a prostyle in antis consisting of six columns on the façade. It also had a cella and a vestibule. The cella was separated from the pronaos by a gate in the Ionian order. Along the rear wall were arrayed statues on bases, possibly some of a later date.

It seems that the temple bore no sculpted decoration, with the exception of the acroteria, which have not, however, been preserved. A possible reason therefore could be that the temple lay very close to the tholos, built a couple of decades earlier and bearing a striking decoration, so the architect of temple C wanted to create a contrast.

Pausanias describes the temple in the 2nd century:

"When you enter the city [of Delphoi] you see temples in a row. The first of them was in ruins . . . the fourth is called the temple of Athena Pronoia (Forethought). Of its two images, the one in the fore-temple is a votive offering of the Massiliots, and is larger than the one inside the temple. The Massiliots are a colony of Phokaia in Ionia . . . The votive offering of the Massiliots is of bronze. The gold shield given to Athena Pronoia by Kroisos the Lydian was said by the Delphians to have been stolen by Philomelos."

The temple could not have functioned to a later date than the 4th or 5th century, when all pagan shrines were closed during the persecution of pagans in the late Roman Empire.

== See also ==
- Tholos of Delphi

== Bibliography ==
- Bommelaer J.-F. (1997). Guide de Delphes. Marmaria, le sanctuaire d’Athéna à Delphes,. Paris.
- Bommelaer, J.-F., Laroche, D., (1991). Guide de Delphes. Le site. Paris, p. 65-68.
- Demangel, G., Daux, G.,(1923), Le sanctuaire d'Athéna Pronaia, Fasc.I: Les temples de tuf, Paris
- Kolonia, R. (2006). The archaeological museum of Delphi, Athens
