= Ex votos of the Argives =

The city of Argos dedicated several ex-votos within the sanctuary of Apollo in Delphi. It was, after all, one of the most powerful cities of the archaic and classical period.

== Description ==
Next to a portico built by the Arcadians along the Sacred Way in the sanctuary of Apollo in Delphi, the visitor would see a semi-circular pedestal dedicated by the Argives after 369 B.C., to stress their contribution to the building of the city of Messene, the capital of the liberated Messenians. The so-called pedestal of the Argive kings depicted the mythical founder of the dynasty, Danaos, and some of his descendants. Cyriacus of Ancona, visiting the antiquities of Delphi in 1436, mistook the semi-circular base of this ex-voto of the Argives for the remains of the temple of Apollo.

Three ex-votos by the Argives and one by the Athenians stood next to the ex-voto of the Lacaedemonians further up the Sacred Way. The first one depicted the Seven heroes who campaigned against Thebes led by the fallen king Polyneikes. The other heroes were Adrastus, Amphiaraus, Kapaneus, Tydeus, Eteoclus, Alitherses and Hippomedon. Nothing is, unfortunately, preserved from that ex-voto. Pausanias mentions that a simulation of the Trojan Horse was also dedicated by the Argives, of which only the rectangular base is preserved; finally, an impressive semi-circular pedestal where the statues of the descendants of the Seven Heroes stood.
