= Ex voto of the Arcadians =

Next to the Bull of the Corcyreans close to the entrance to the sanctuary of Apollo in Delphi lay a grandiose monument dedicated by the Arcadians, particularly the Tegeates.

== Description ==
The ex-voto of the Arcadians is marked nowadays by an oblong base; it served for supporting a complex of bronze statues, dedicated by the Arcadians, particularly the Tegeates, in order to honour their victorious campaign in Laconia, together with the Thebans, in 370/369 B.C. The nine statues which stood there depicted Apollo, Nike, Callisto and six Arcadian heroes: Ephasus, Triphylus, Azan, Elatus, Apheidas and Arkas. The sculptors were, reportedly, Pausanias from Apollonia (who created Apollo and Kallisto), Samolas from Arcadia (who created Triphylus and Azan), Antiphanes from Argos (who created Ephasus, Elatus and Apheidas) and Daedalus from Sicyon (who created Nike and Arkas). At that spot were discovered several stelae with inscriptions on behalf of the Arcadians, set up by various Greek cities. Three more votive offerings stood there (one bearing the statue of the Achaean general Philopoemen) and decorated the facade of a portico (measuring 22.23x6.27) dated to the 4th century B.C., possibly also built by Arcadians. The portico had a stylobate made of limestone and Doric columns made of poros stone.
