= Agias (disambiguation) =

Agias (Gr. Ἀγίας) can refer to a number of people from classical history:

- Agias, an epic poet from the 8th century BC
- Agias of Sparta, an ancient seer
- Agias, the author of a work on Argolis, the Argolica (Ἀργολικά), according to Athenaeus (iii). He is called a musician in another passage (xiv) but this may be a different person.
