= Craterus' ex voto =

Among the famous ex votos of Delphi was that of Craterus, friend and general of Alexander the Great, attributed to Lysippos.

== Description ==
The excavations of the French Archaeological School revealed the remains of a rectangular building measuring 15.27 x 6.35 m situated between the temple of Apollo and the theatre. Its walls stand to a height of 4 meters. The building was probably a portico with Ionic or Doric columns on the facade. On its rear wall was discovered a dedicatory inscription in ten verses, according to which the building was identified with a panhellenic sanctuary, known from the ancient sources as the ex voto of Craterus, the Macedonian general and close friend of Alexander the Great. Plutarch mentions that Craterus dedicated in Delphi a bronze sculpted complex, made by the famous 4th century B.C. sculptors Leochares and Lysippos. Pliny, however, attributes the work solely to Lysippos. The sculpture depicted the scene of a lion hunt, i.e. a well-known incident of Alexander's life, when he was saved by Craterus during a lion hunt in the East. According to the inscription, the ex voto was dedicated not by Craterus himself, but by his son, after his father's death, probably around 320 B.C., or at the end of the 4th century B.C.

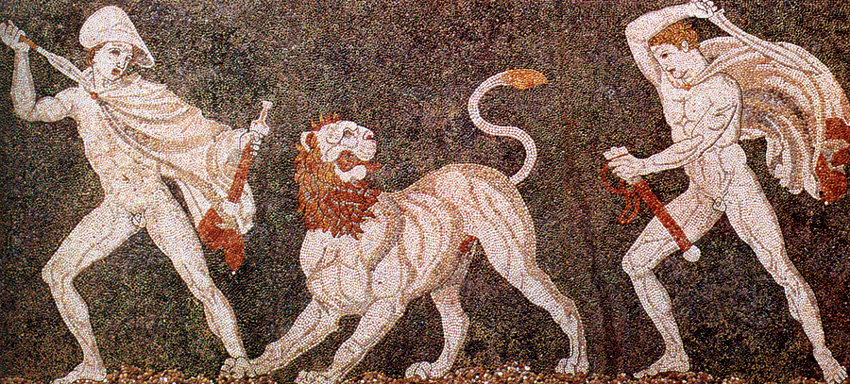
Lion hunt mosaic, House of Dionysus, Pella

The sculpture, lost today, would have been placed on a pedestal against the back wall of the building, whereas the figures would have been arrayed one next to the other. The attempts at a reconstruction are based on ancient sources as well as on some preserved works of art that seem to be inspired by the specific ex voto. For example, a base decorated in relief with the depiction of a lion hunt found in Messina and displayed now in the Louvre, is possibly copying the Delphi sculpture. It has also been suggested that the lion hunt scene from the mosaic pavement of the "House of Dionysus" in Pella repeats the same pattern. In the ex-voto of Delphi Alexander and Craterus either on horseback or on foot- probably stood to the right and left of the lion, engaged in a heroic battle against it. Another suggestion is that Craterus was on horseback and Alexander on foot. The work was a closed composition with the hunting scene developed in the centre.

== Sources ==
- Pausanias, Description of Greece, X, Phocica
- Stewart, A., Faces of Power, Alexander's Image and Hellenistic Politics, University of California Press, 1993.
- Stroud, R.S.."Delphi. Dedication to Apollo by Krateros, shortly after 320 B.C. (39-474)", SEG 37, 418 <http://referenceworks.brillonline.com/entries/supplementum-epigraphicum-graecum/delphi-dedication-to-apollo-by-krateros-shortly-after-320-bc-37-418-a37_418>
- Voutiras, E., "Zur historischen Bedeutung des Krateros-Weihgeschenkes in Delphi", Würzburger Jahrbücherfür die Altertumswissenschaft n. F. 10,1984,: 57–62.
- Wheatley, P., and Dunn, C., 'Craterus and the Dedication Date of the Delphi Lion Monument', Ancient History Bulletin 26 (2012), 43–51.
- Σαατσόγλου - Παλιαδέλη, Χ., "Το Ανάθημα του Κρατερού στους Δελφούς, Μεθοδολογικά Προβλήματα Αναπαράστασης", Εγνατία 1, 1989, 82–99.
