= Treasury of the Massaliots (Delphi) =

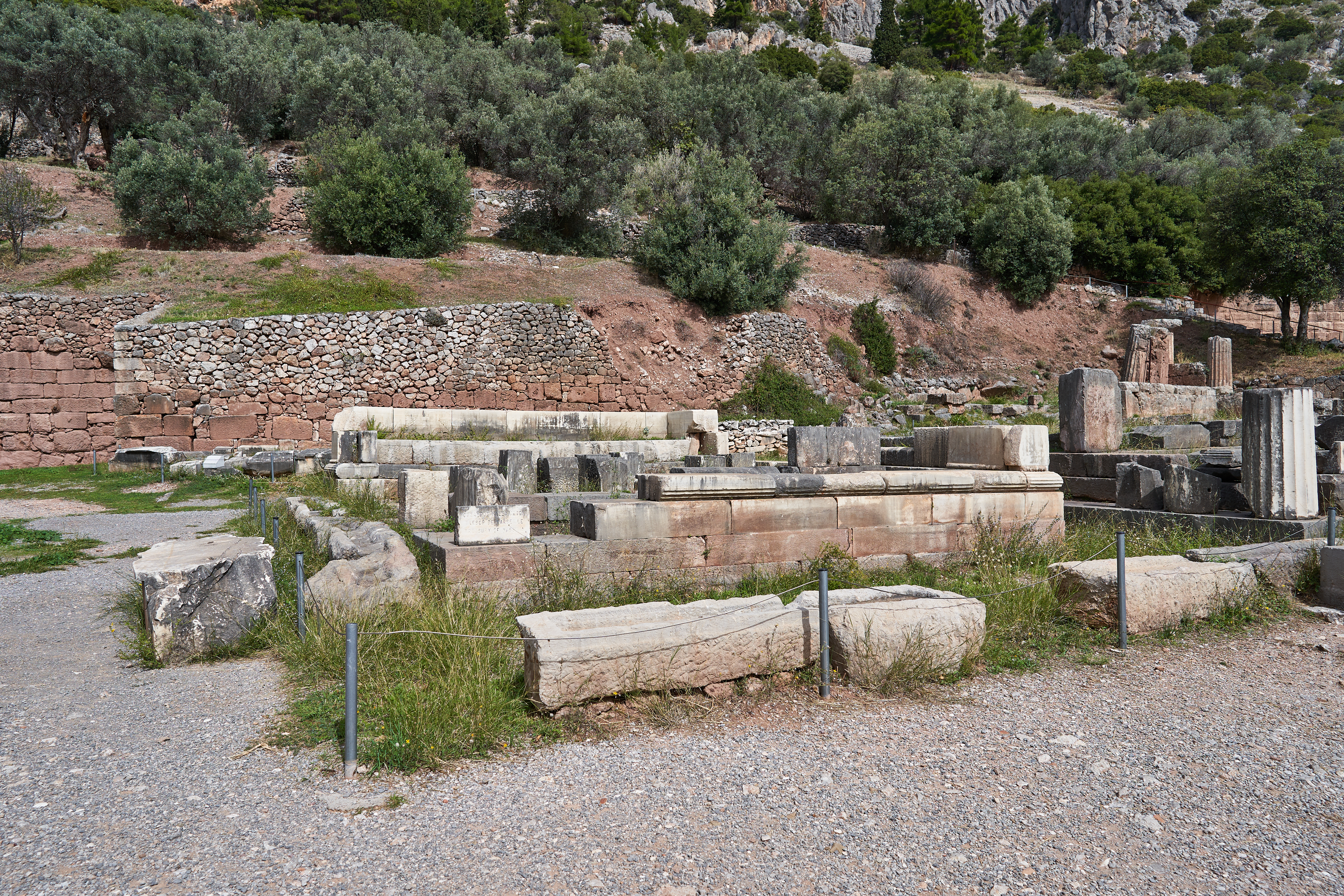
Treasury of the Massaliots (Delphi)

The treasury of the Massaliots was situated in the Sanctuary of Athena Pronaia. It looked like a small temple in antis with two columns on the façade; it was constructed of Parian marble and among its remarkable features were its "Aeolian" capitals.

== Description ==
Within the Sanctuary of Athena Pronaea, to the west of the Athena temples and side to side with the Doric Treasury, was erected a treasury with a vestibule and cella. It had two columns on the facade, decorated with Aeolic capitals, which are generally considered as the precursors to the Corinthian capitals. The building measures 6.14 x 8.63 meters, it dates to ca 510 BC. Its elevation was built of Parian marble. Its height was about 7.8 meters. One at least of its pediments bore sculpted decoration consisting of a chariot dragged by four horses. The sima was decorated with lion heads, whereas it was flanked by Nike-form acroteria. The Ionian frieze spread along its three sides, at least, and comprised more than 140 figures in battle scenes. An Amazonomachy and a Centauromachy have been securely identified.

The Treasury was built by the Massaliots in order to enhance their increasing commercial power. Marseille was, after all, a colony of Phocaea in Asia Minor which was founded by Phocaeans. However, it is possible that it constituted also an ex voto for the victory of the Massaliots against the native tribe of the Ligurians. Its identification is verified also by a fragmentary inscription on a marble architectural member, found in the region.

In 2013, the sculpted decoration of the treasury was reconstructed in 3D form, for the celebrations of the anniversary of 2500 years since the foundation of Marseille.
