= Tholos of Delphi =

Ancient Greek temple to Athena Pronaia

Coordinates: 38°28′49″N 22°30′28″E

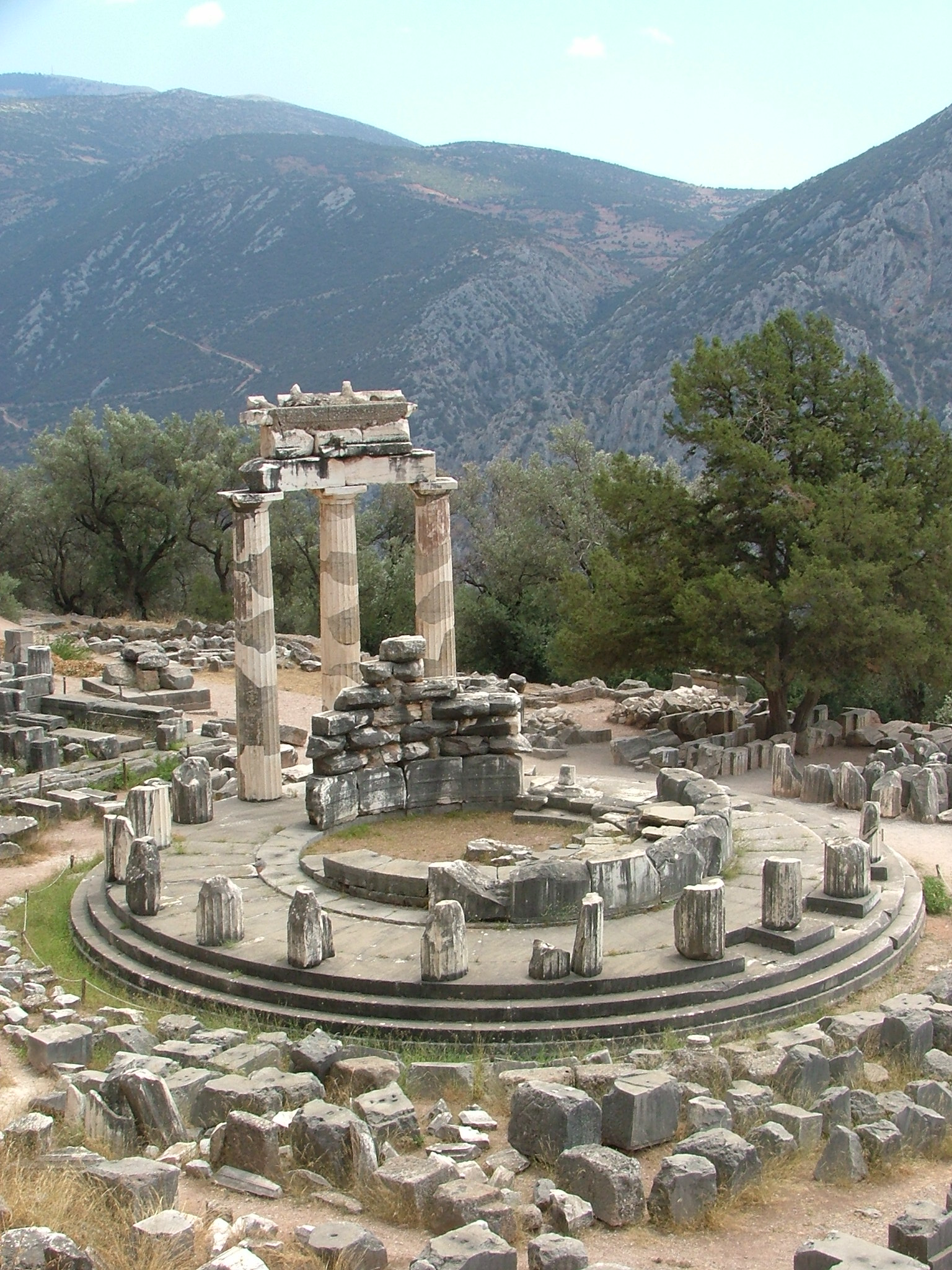
The Tholos of Delphi in August 2007

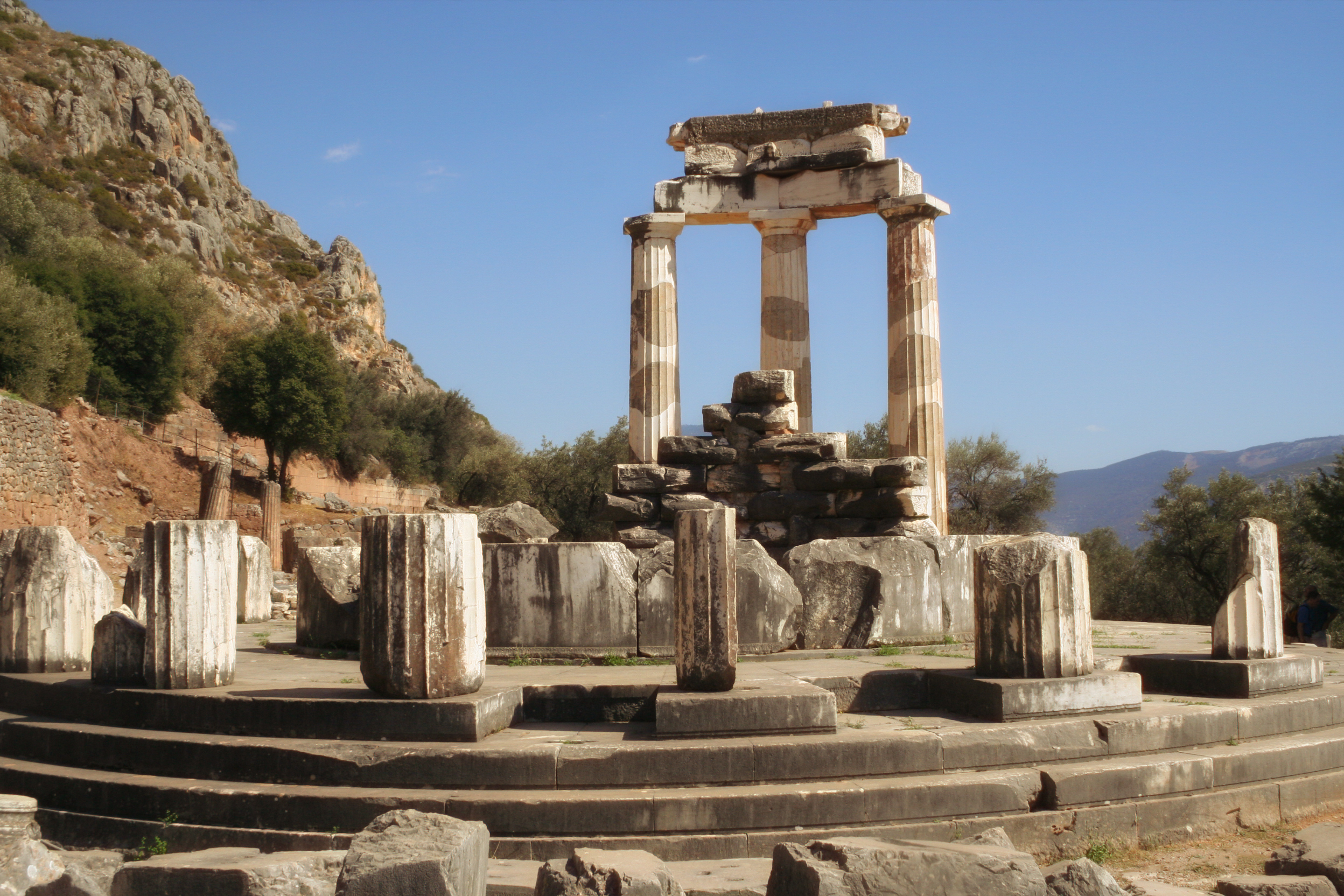

The Tholos of Delphi is among the ancient structures of the Sanctuary of Athena Pronaia in Delphi. The circular temple, a tholos, shares the immediate site with other ancient foundations of the Temple of Athena Pronaia, all located less than a mile east of the main ruins at Delphi, in the modern Greek regional unit of Phocis. The tholos is part of the Delphi UNESCO World Heritage Site.

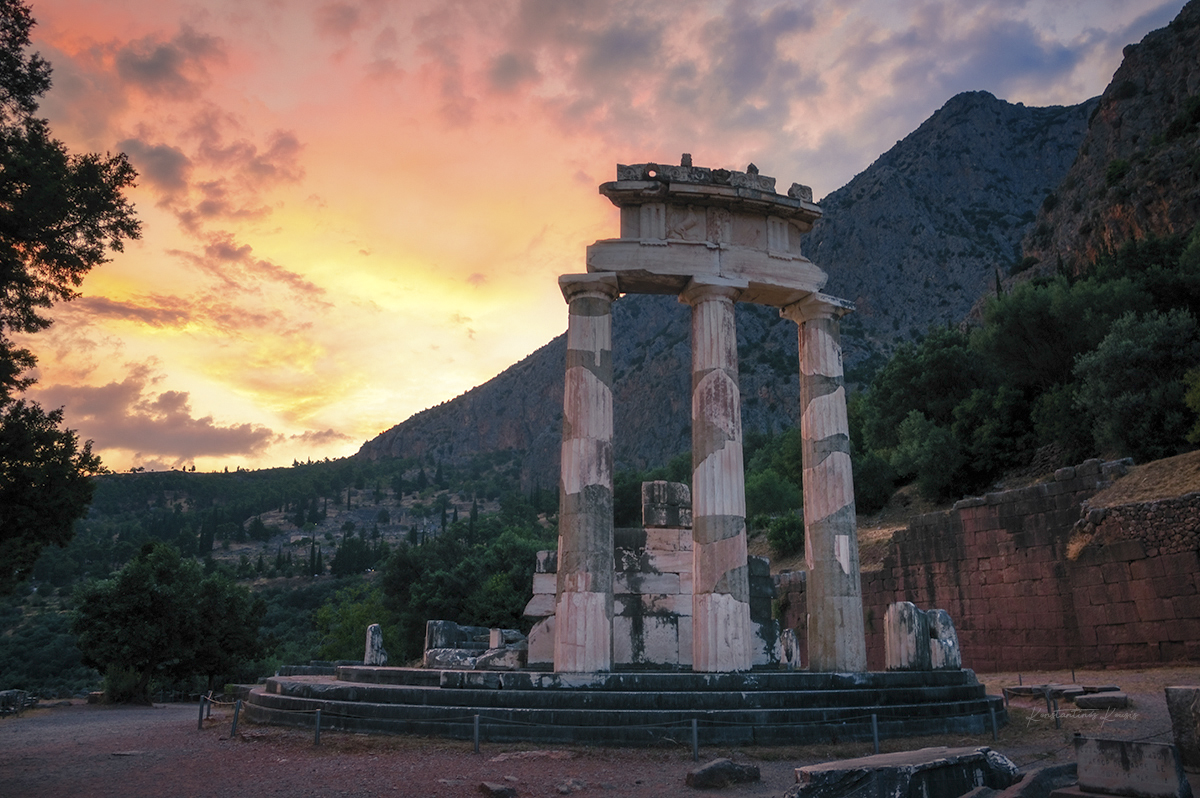
The three reconstructed Doric columns of the tholos

== Architecture ==
The architect of the "vaulted temple at Delphi" is named by Vitruvius in De architectura Book VII as Theodorus Phoceus (not Theodorus of Samos, whom Vitruvius names separately).

Externally, twenty Doric columns supported a frieze with triglyphs and metopes. The circular wall of the cella, the central chamber of the building, was also crowned by a similar frieze, metopes, and triglyphs, but to a lesser extent. Inside, a stone bench was positioned on which stood ten Corinthian style pilasters, all of them attached to the concave surface of the wall.

The manifold combination and blending of various architectural orders in the same building was completed through a natural polychromatic effect, resulting from the use of different materials. Materials used included Eleusinian thin slabs (called "titanolithos") and Pentelic marble in the superstructure and limestone at the platform. The building's eight-arched roof was also constructed of marble, and was decorated respectively by eight female statues carved in sharp and lively motion.

== The sculptures on the dome ==
The sculptured decoration of the dome was also beautifully crafted by hitherto unknown craftsmen. It is dated between 380 and 370 BC. High reliefs ascribed the figures of the metopes, which contributed to being easily detached from the plates and be reused as building material and tomb covers in the early Christian years after they were smoothed over again. Following strenuous and time-consuming efforts of specialists who attempted to agglutinate the fragments around the monument, we can today have at least an incomplete picture of its original form and the stylistic and decorative elements of its relief representations. In the major metopes of the outer side there are scene representations from Amazon and Centaur battles, already known from mythology and very dear to Greek sculpture. In the inside, the figures of the frieze survived unfortunately at a very small scale and with high fragmentation. They allegedly portrayed labors, either by Hercules or Theseus.

Despite their fragmentary nature, the architectural reliefs on the Dome of Delphi reveal the great skill of their creators, as regards both the treatment of materials – especially marble – and catching details with vitality and excellent anatomical accuracy. All these novel compounds with unexpected combinations in the iconographic tradition of the 4th century BC introduce an innovative artistic movement, resulting in a creative competition between the art of relief and sculpted plastic art. Particularly to achieve the above confrontational blending of antithetical elements, the discernible elements include the high relief which may be detached from the plate of the panel, the kinesiological freedoms of the sculptures achieved through their details, as well as the dramatic intensity reflected in the figures to demonstrate the passion and the fury of the conflict of enemies in lively battle scenes.

== See also ==
- Pausanias' description of Delphi
