= Pair of athletes (Delphi) =

The pair of athletes, two bronze figurines at the Delphi Archaeological Museum, remind vividly of the Pythian Games.

== Description ==
In separate, free-standing cases in the middle of room 9 of the Delphi Archaeological Museum bronze statuettes are exhibited: a Corinthian figurine of a man wearing himation and playing the aulos (460–450 BC), a bronze incense-burner in the form of a "peplophoros", and two naked athletes dated to the same period and originating from Attica. One of the athletes holds a halter and a wreath (or strigil). These figurines constitute a proof of the Pythian Games, both athletic and musical, which took place in Delphi every four years.
