= Altar of the Chians =

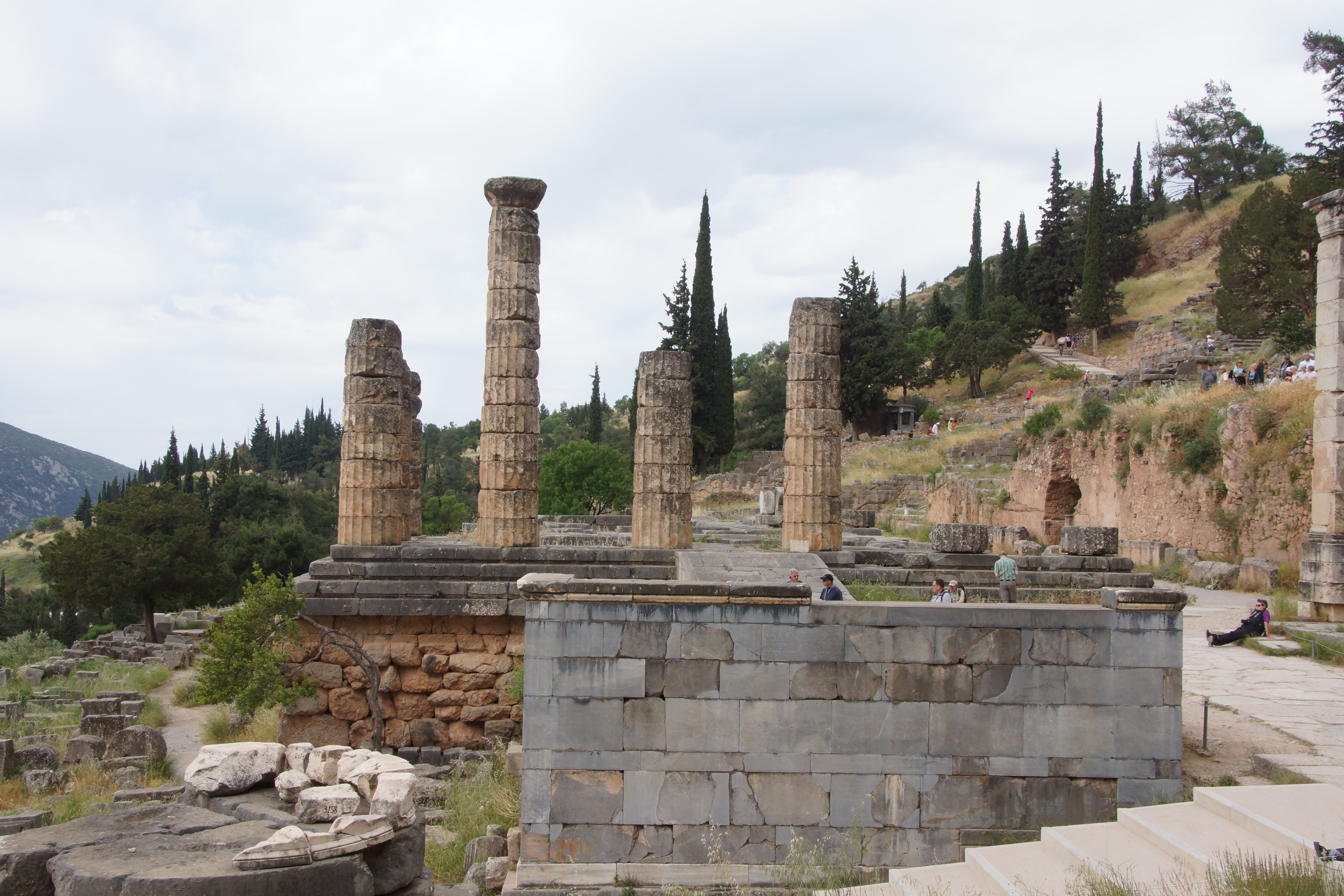
Altar of the Chians

The Altar of the Chians was the altar of the Temple of Apollo at Delphi, dedicated by the people of Chios.

== Description ==
The Altar of the Chians was the main altar of the Temple of Apollo at Delphi. It was built after the reconstruction of the Temple in the 330s, replacing an older altar dated to the time of the Alcmaeonids. The 4th century altar was dedicated by the people of Chios, as related on an inscription on the left side of its crowning. On the right part of the euthynteria is written an inscription offering the promanteia to the Chians. The altar consists of a nucleus made of limestone and bearing a revetment with slabs of bluish marble. The table of offerings was made of white marble and the priests probably climbed on it via a staircase. Spiral decorative elements flank the upper part of the altar, which is also crowned by a cymatium. According to recent scholarship, the monument dates to the 3rd century B.C., possibly after 246/245, when the island of Chios became a member of the Amphictyony.

== Bibliography ==
- Amandry, J., «Delphes», BCH 105, 1981, 739-740.
- Αmandry, P., « Chios and Delphi», σε Chios, A Conference at the Homereion in Chios, 1984, London 1986, 205-232.
- Bommelaer, J.-F., Laroche, D., Guide de Delphes. Le site, Sites et Monuments 7, Paris 1991, 170-175.
- Gruben, G., « Kykladische Architektur», MüJb 23, 1972, 24-26.
- Laroche, D., «L’autel d’Apollon à Delphes: éléments nouveaux», σε L’espace sacrificiel dans les civilisations méditerranéennes de l’Antiquité, Lyon-Paris 1991, 103-107.
- Stikas, E., «La restauration de l'autel d'Apollon à Delphes», BCH 103, 1979, 479-500.
