= Tisamenus (son of Antiochus) =

Tisamenus (Ancient Greek: Τισαμενός), an Elean, the son of Antiochus, is mentioned in The History by Herodotus. Tisamenus was a soothsayer for the Greek army during the Persian War, from the clan of the Iamidae. A Delphic oracle had foretold that he would win five great battles. He thought it meant he would win in sports, and trained for the Pentathlon. He almost won the Olympic prize. The Spartans thought the prophesy was not about sports, but about war, so they wished to hire him. Tisamenus asked for citizenship, and the Spartans were insulted and did not grant. Then the Spartans thought about the Persian threat, and returned. Tisamenus asked for both citizenship for himself and his brother, just like Melampus. The Spartans acquiesced. They were the only foreign men this privilege had ever been bestowed upon.

After hiring him, indeed, the Spartans won five "very great victories":

- at Plataea
- at Tegea over the Tegeans and Argives
- at Dipaea over all Arcadians except the Mantineans
- at Ithome over the Messenians
- at Tanagra over the Athenians and Argives (presumably the same battle in 457 B.C. recorded in Thucydides 1.107)
