= Stoa of the Athenians =

Coordinates: 38°28′55.68″N 22°30′6.72″E

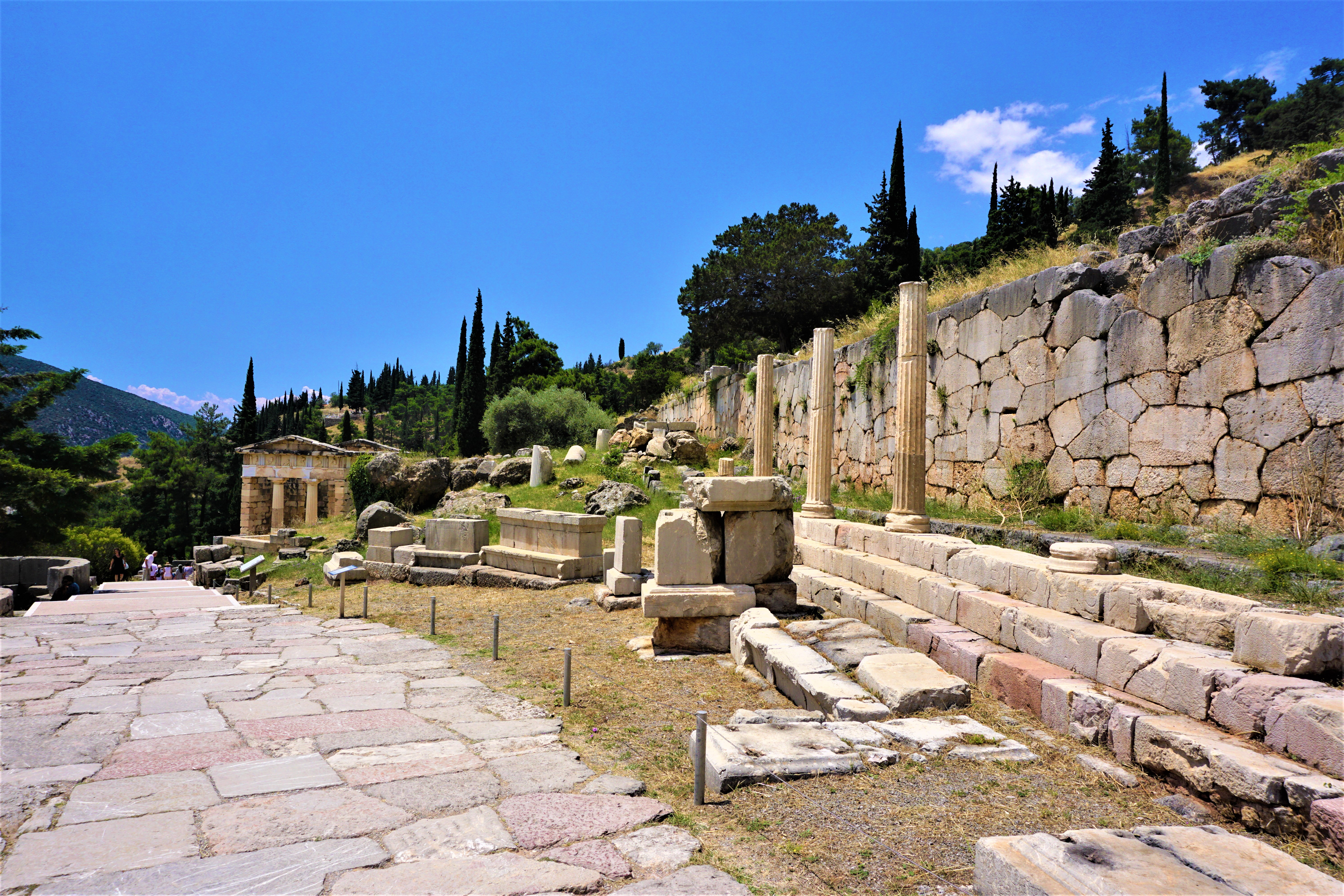
The Stoa of the Athenians, Delphi.

The Stoa of the Athenians is an ancient portico in the Delphic Sanctuary, Greece, located south of the Temple of Apollo. The southern side of the polygonal wall of the platform forms the north wall of the stoa. It was constructed c. 478 BC-470 BC during the early Classical period. The one-aisled stoa with Ionic colonnade opens toward the southeast. It was dedicated by the Athenians after the Persian Wars.

== Description of the Stoa ==
The Stoa of the Athenians is built against the polygonal wall supporting the terrace of the temple of Apollo. The monument has been identified through the inscription of the stylobate: ΑΘΗΝΑΙΟΙ ΑΝΕΘΕΣΑΝ ΤΗΝ ΣΤΟΑΝ ΚΑΙ ΤΑ ΟΠΛ[Α Κ]ΑΙ ΤΑΚΡΟΤΕΡΙΑ ΕΛΟΝΤΕΣ ΤΩΝ ΠΟΛΕΜΙΩΝ [The Athenians dedicated the portico and the armaments and the figure heads of the ships that they seized from their enemies]. The "armaments" mentioned in the inscription refer probably to ropes taken from Persian ships, quite possibility the ropes they used to build their extensive pontoon bridge across the Hellespont. On a three-stepped stylobate measuring 26.5 meters long and 3.10 meters wide stand seven monolithic fluted columns of the Ionic order. They are made of Pentelic marble and their bases are made of Paros marble. They are 3.31 meters high. The distance between them is quite large, thus creating openings allowing ample light to enter the building, which was probably covered with a wooden roof. The stylobate and the colonnade have been restored and are extant today in situ. On the polygonal wall at the back of the stoa, particularly on the western part, have been carved about six hundred manumission inscriptions, in the form of fictitious sale of slaves to the god. Most probably, the portico was constructed after the naval victories against the Persians at Mykale and Sestos in 478 B.C. It was used for storing the war spoils, mainly from naval victories against the Persians. War spoils from naval battles at Mykale, Sestos, Salamis and the Hellespont were included.

== Background ==
The remains of the Stoa of the Athenians were discovered by Bernard Haussoullier in 1880. The stoa was constructed in Delphi after the naval victory over the Persians at Sestus near the Hellespont in 478 BC. It was dedicated to Apollo, and the Athenians that perished in the Persian War. On display in the stoa were armaments taken from the vast pontoon bridge the Persians had built across the Hellespont at the beginning of the Persian War (480). The Persian King Xerxes had ordered the construction of the bridges to expedite the movement of his enormous forces across the straight. It was built by lashing together ships with ropes and setting planks on them. In 479 the Athenians attacked the last remnants of Persians on the Greek side of the Hellespont at Sestos. After they defeated them at the end of a long siege in 478, the Athenians and islanders dismantled the boat bridges, bringing home some of the cables the Persians had used to lash the boats together. In the following years, more exhibits were put on display in the Athenian stoa at Delphi, as the Athenians gained more naval victories. The war memorials on display were dedicated to Apollo, but they also served as monuments of Athens victory. Of the entire stoa, only the rear polygonal wall, stylobate, and northeast foundations, with a few columns remain today.

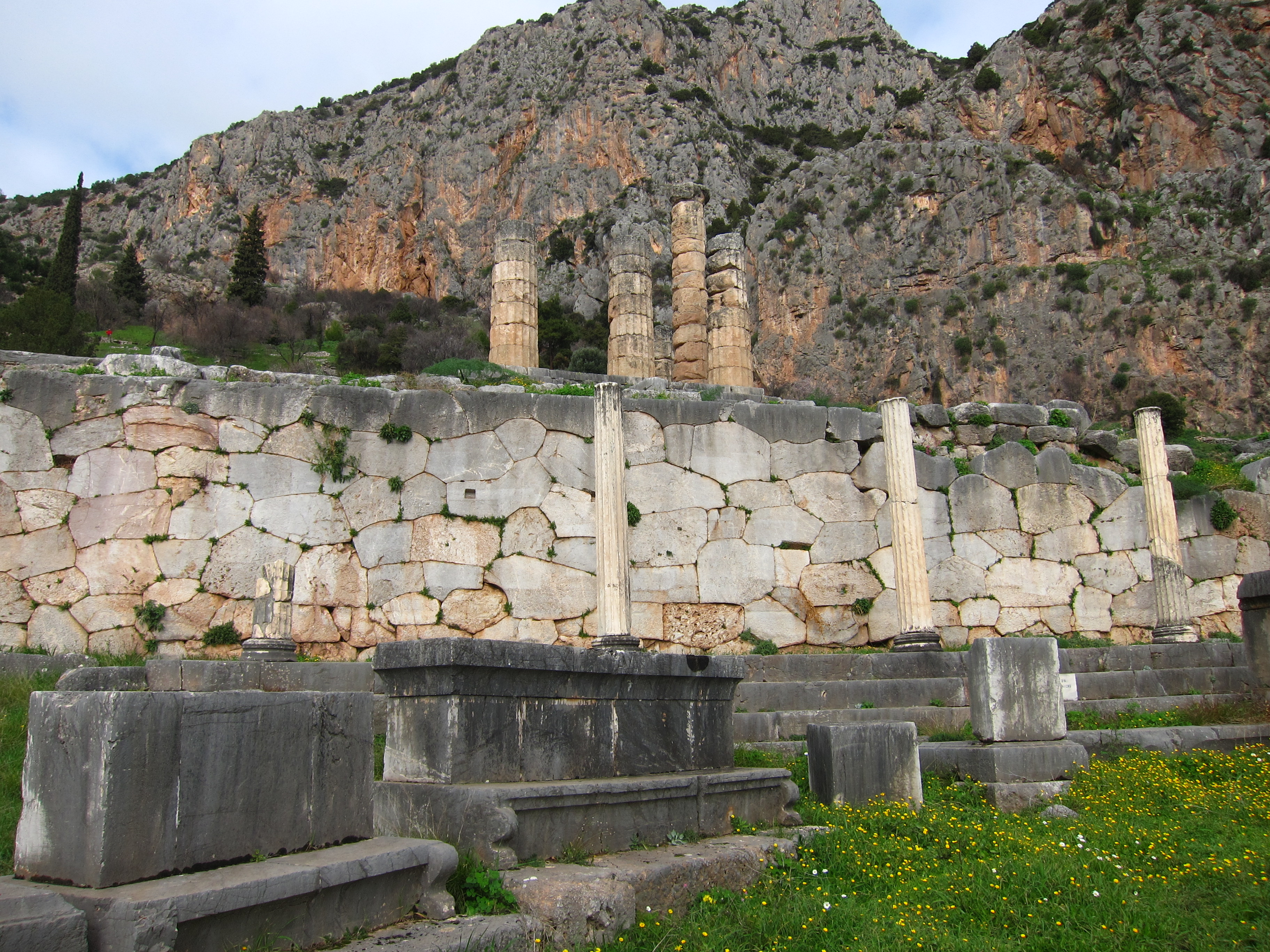
Another view of the rear wall and remaining columns from the Stoa at Delphi

== Design ==
A stoa is a portico consisting of a back wall and a colonnade in front supporting a roof. The Stoa of the Athenians at Delphi used a pre-existing wall, the Polygonal Wall, which dates to about 560 B.C., as its back wall, which was serving as the retaining wall for the terrace supporting the Temple of Apollo just to the north. The Stoa of the Athenians was built with a wooden, shedded roof with hipped ends, a wooden entablature, and seven marble columns set apart from each other at a distance of 3.58-meters. At their base, the columns were .39-meter in diameter. Unlike most stoas, the columns of the Stoa of the Athenians were marble and executed in the Ionic, not Doric style. Three nearly complete columns have been set up on the modern archaeological site, along with the fragment of a fourth. Although the rafters were never recovered, evidence suggests that they spanned across the roof at 3.5-meter intervals.

== Bibliography ==
- Amandry, P., « Le portique des Athéniens à Delphes », BCH 70, 1946, 1-8
- Bommelaer, J.-F., « Les Portiques de Delphes », RA 1993, 33-51.
- Bommelaer, J.-F., Laroche, D., Guide de Delphes. Le site, Sites et Monuments 7, Paris 1991, 147-150.
- Christopher Mee & Antony Spawforth, Greece (An Oxford Archaeological Guide). Oxford/ OUP, 2001, p. 307-309.
- Coulton, J. J., The Architectural Development of the Greek Stoa, Oxford 1976, 234.
- Haussoullier, B., "Le Portique des Athéniens et ses abords", BCH 5, 1881, 1-19.
- Photios Petsas, Delphi : Monuments and Museum. Athens : Krene Editions, 2008, p. 47.
- Robin Barber, Greece (Blue Guide), London- N.Y. 2001 (Revised reprint of the 6th edition of 1995), pp. 397.
- Umholz, G., “Architraval Arrogance? Dedicatory Inscriptions in Greek Architecture of the Classical Period”, Hesperia 71, 2002, 261-293.
- Walsh, J., « The Date of the Athenian Stoa at Delphi», AJA 90, 1986, 319-336.
