= Ex voto of the Lacaedemonians =

After the naval Battle of Aegospotami, the Lacedaemonians dedicated a majestic ex voto in Delphi.

== Description ==
To the left of the entrance into the sanctuary of Apollo, opposite to the base of the Arcadians stood the large votive offering of the Lacaedemonians, celebrating their victory against the Athenians at Aegospotami in 405 BC. It depicted Castor and Pollux, Zeus, Apollo, Artemis as well as the Spartan navarch Lysander, receiving a wreath by Poseidon, and finally the generals of the Lacaedemonians in this particular naval battle, such as Hermon (captain of Lysander's ship) and the soothsayer Agias: in total the monument comprised 38 bronze statues. Some fragments of the base, partly preserved and restored, are what is left nowadays from this pretentious monument. There are also preserved some fragments of epigrams from the base of the monument, referring to the Dioskouroi, to Lysander and to Arakos, admiral of the Lacaedemonian fleet.

Pausanias mentions also some of the sculptors who worked for the construction of the monument: the Megarian Theokosmos had made the statue of Hermon, the Argive Antiphanes had made Castor and Pollux, Agias was created by Pison, originating from Kalavria in Troezen, and the Arcadians Dameas and Athenodoros had made the gods' statues.

== Bibliography ==
- Bommelaer, J.-F., Laroche, D., Guide de Delphes, Le Site, Paris 1991
- Bousquet, J., "Inscriptions de Delphes", BCH 85, 1961, 69-97
