= Sibyl rock =

Outcropping of rock at Delphi, Greece

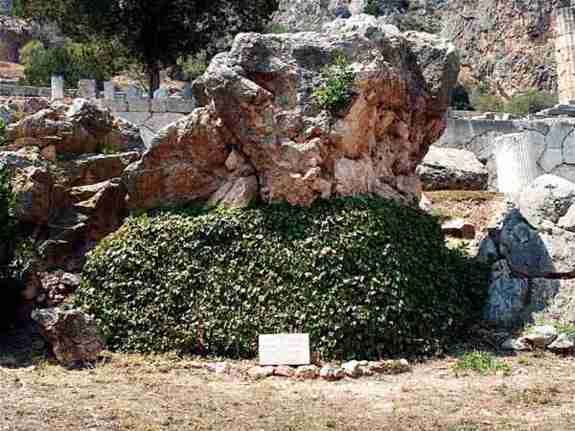
The Sibyline Rock from the Sanctuary of Apollo at Delphi

Sibyl rock is an outcropping of rock on the site of Delphi, standing just to the south of the Polygonal Wall.

== Description by Pausanias ==
Pausanias, a visitor to the site in the 2nd century CE, writes in his travel log: There is a rock rising up above the ground. On it, say the Delphians, there stood and chanted the oracles a woman, by name Herophile and surnamed Sibyl. The former Sibyl I find was as ancient as any; the Greeks say that she was a daughter of Zeus by Lamia, daughter of Poseidon, that she was the first woman to chant oracles, and that the name Sibyl was given her by the Libyans.
