= Stadium of Delphi =

Building in Delphi, Central Greece Region, Greece

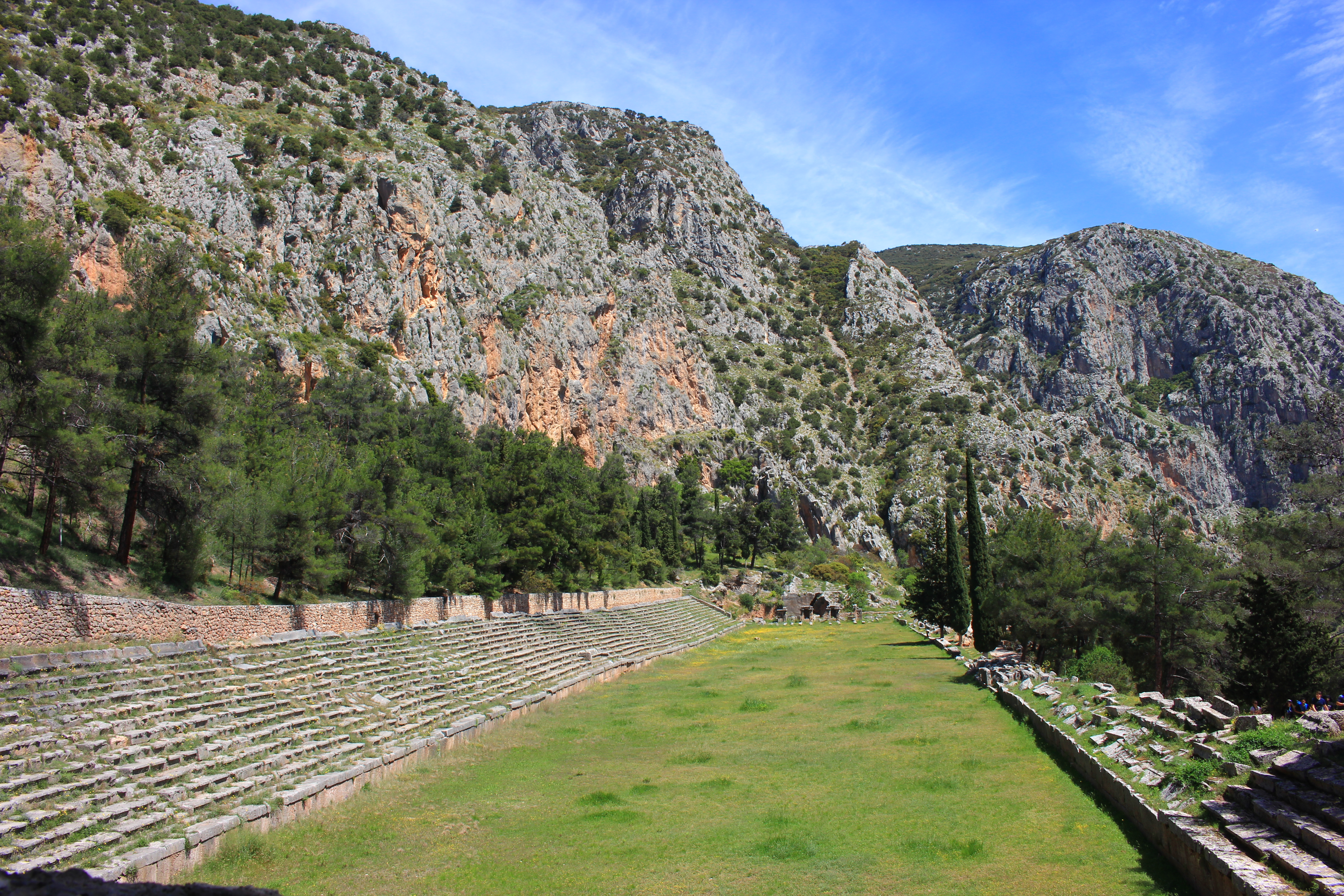
The stadium in Delphi, Greece

The Stadium of Delphi lies on the highest spot of the Archaeological Site of Delphi. It overlooks the sanctuary of Apollo and has a view to the Delphic landscape. It was built either within the second half of the 4th century B.C. or even after the Galatian attacks. Its measured 178 meters in length and knew several refurbishment phases. The Stadium of Delphi is the best preserved ancient stadium in Greece.

== Description ==
The stadium occupied the highest part of the site, built over and to the northwest of the sanctuary of Apollo. It is epigraphically attested as "the pythikon stadion". To the north it was supported by the slope of the mountain, whereas to the south a wall was built to support the seats for the spectators. It is unknown when the site actually started being used for the Pythian Games. However, archaeological study shows that the actual architectural formation took place either within the second half of the 4th century or towards the mid-3rd century BC, after the victory against the Galatians and possibly at the instigation of the Aetolian League. Within the stadium took place the "gymnastic" contests, i.e., the track and field sports. Musical contests were probably organized there as well. A 2nd century BC inscription informs us on Satyr the Samian who performed a hymn "for the god and the Greeks" to the sound of the guitar.

Another interesting inscription, embedded on the eastern side of the support wall, is that forbidding to take out the wine destined for sacred rituals. The inscription has attracted the interest of epigraphists, but it has been proposed that maybe this was not its original place and that it is actually in second use.

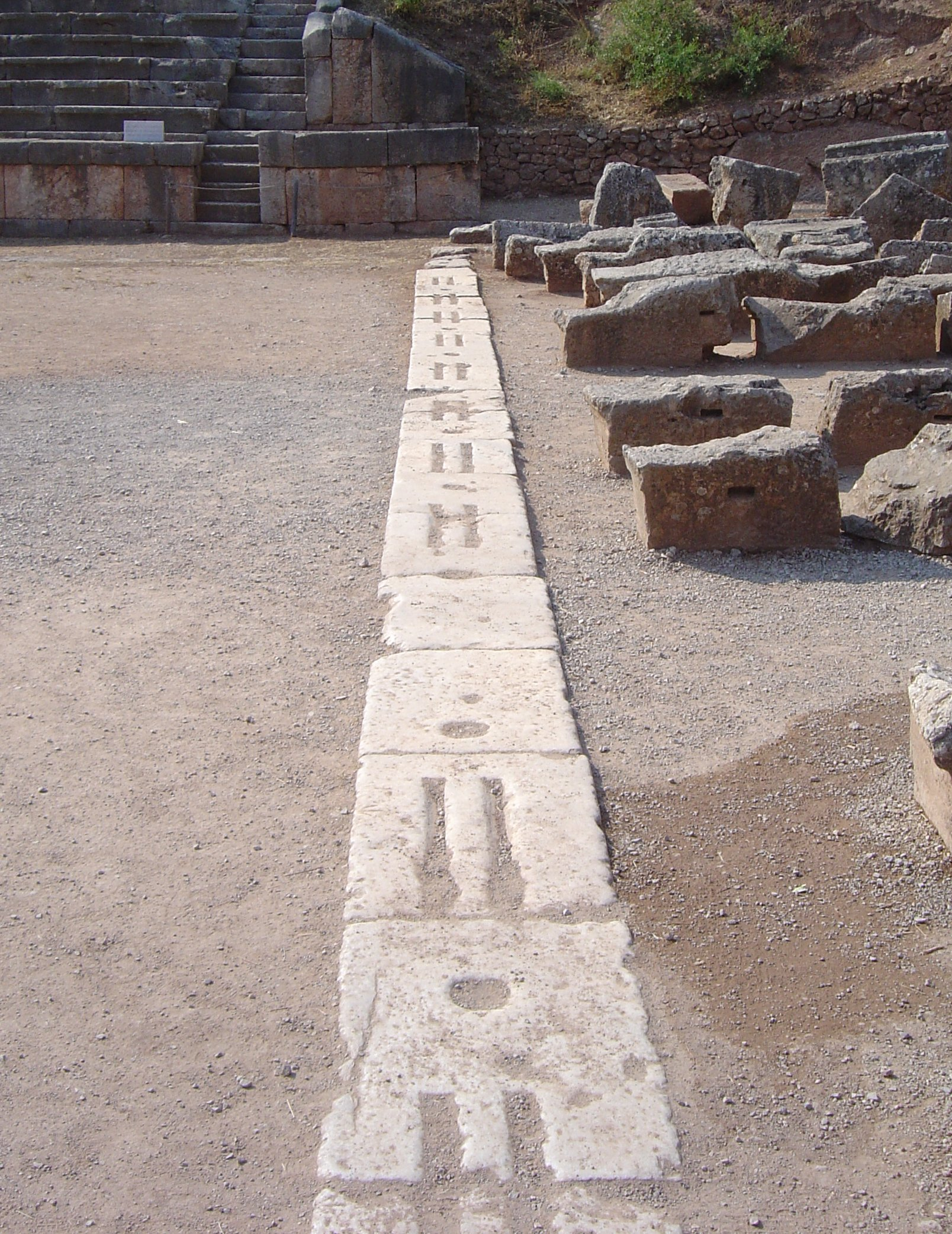
The starting line

The construction of the stadium can be discerned in at least four different phases. The initial construction dates, as mentioned above, to the 4th or mid-3rd century BC The latter dating coincides with the celebration of the Soteria, ceremonial celebration of the victory against the Galatians. Its track is 177.55 m long (about 550 ft.), and 25.50 m wide. Up to 20 athletes could compete simultaneously on the tracks, but soon the tracks were reduced to 17. The aphesis (starting points) were made of stone. The tiers on the south side were added only in 100 BC. A final restoration phase took place in the Roman period, consisting of the revetment of the tiers with stone.

The total capacity was about 6,500 spectators. The starting line is preserved on the east accompanied with two rows of incised slabs for placing the feet of the runners. Four pillars on the eastern side must have supported a monumental arch.

== See also ==
- Stadium at Olympia

== Bibliography ==
- Aupert, P., (1977) « Un édifice dorique archaïque à l’emplacement du stade», BCH Supplément 4, pp. 229–245*Aupert, P.,(1979) Le Stade, Fouilles de Delphes II.10, 1979
- Bommelaer, J.-F., Laroche, D.,(1991) Guide de Delphes. Le site, Sites et Monuments 7, Paris, pp. 213–216.
- Homolle, Th.,(1899) « Le stade de Delphes », BCH 23, 601-615
- Pouilloux, J., (1977) «Travaux à Delphes à l’occasion des Pythia », BCH Supplément 4, 103–123.
