= Lesche =

Lesche (Ancient Greek: λέσχη) is an Ionic Greek word, signifying council or conversation, and a place for it There is frequent mention of places of public resort, in the Greek cities, by the name of leschai (λέσχαι, the Greek plural of lesche), some set apart for the purpose, and others so called because they were so used by loungers; to the latter class belong the agora and its porticoes, the gymnasia, and the shops of various tradesmen, especially those of the smiths, which were frequented in winter on account of their warmth, and in which, for the same reason, the poor sought shelter for the night.

In these passages, however, in which are the earliest examples of the use of the word, it seems to refer to places distinct from the smiths' workshops, though resorted to in the same manner; and we may gather from the grammarians, that there were in the Greek cities numerous small buildings or porticoes, furnished with seats, and exposed to the sun, to which the idle resorted to enjoy conversation, and the poor to obtain warmth and shelter, and which were called leschai: at Athens alone there were 360 such. The Suda, referring to a passage in Hesiod, explains lesche (λέσχη) by means of the word kaminos (κάμινος, "oven" or "furnace").

By Aeschylus and Sophocles the word is used for a solemn council; but elsewhere the same writers, as well as Herodotus, employ it to signify common conversation.

In the Dorians states the word retained the meaning of a place of meeting for deliberation and intercourse, a council-chamber or club-room. At Sparta every phyle had its lesche, in which and in the gymnasium the elders passed the greater part of the day in serious and sportive conversation, and in which the newborn children were presented for the decision of the elders as to whether they should be brought up or destroyed. Some of these Spartan leschae seem to have been halls of some architectural pretensions: Pausanias mentions two of them, the lesche krotanon (λέσχη Κροτανῶν) and the lesche poikile (λέσχη ποικίλη). They were also used for other purposes.

There were generally chambers for council and conversation, called by this name, attached to the temples of Apollo, one of whose epithets was Apollo Leschenorios (Λεσχηνόριος). Of such leschae the chief was the Lesche of the Knidians, which was erected at Delphi by the Cnidians, and which was celebrated throughout Greece, less for its own magnificence, than for the paintings with which it was adorned by Polygnotus.
