= Manumission inscriptions at Delphi =

The archaeological site of Delphi is an incredible source of information on Greek epigraphy. The most numerous single category of inscriptions are the manumission inscriptions, which reach roughly a number of 1300.

== Acts of manumission ==
In antiquity, manumission was the act of freeing slaves by their owners. Slaves belonged to their masters until they served long enough or until they gathered the necessary sum of money for their liberation. When that moment came, the act of manumission had to be guaranteed by a god, most commonly Apollo. The slave was thus fictitiously sold to the deity, so that the sale action could never be violated. The act was recorded on inscriptions with a rather formulaic expression. The majority of the manumission inscriptions of Delphi are gathered in two main spots: on the supporting wall of the parodoi of the theatre and on the polygonal wall, particularly the part which served as back wall to the portico of the Athenians. Most of the inscriptions date between 200 B.C. and 100 A.D.

== Manumission inscriptions as a source of information ==
Despite their stylized expressions, these inscriptions offer an insights into Greek social and demographic history. Over 60% of the manumission inscriptions of Delphi concern female slaves. A comparison of prices proves that most female slaves were manumitted at a price roughly 20% lower than men. However, it seems that liberation in many cases was not complete: slaves are required under a paramone clause to stay with their ex masters for a specific period of time or until the latter passed away. One wonders what kind of freedom this was, but it seems that in some cases this was considered better than nothing, as the master did not have complete rights of life and death over them; furthermore, there were cases in which the slaves had become almost members of the family, so they did not want to be separated from their social environment, yet they would rather have the choice. The manumission acts were usually attended by witnesses, whose names are also mentioned on the inscription. The other people mentioned are the priests of the temple of Apollo and thus manumission inscriptions constitute an excellent source for tracing the succession lists of the priesthood of Delphi.

A careful examination of the names and place of origin of those who liberated their slaves proves that the "trend" of liberating slaves in Delphi came with the advent of the Aetolians. The majority of masters were of Aetolian origin at least in the first century. However, the trend soon spread and the next two largest categories are, naturally, Locrians and Phocians, who lived nearby.

One inscription from Delphi (IJO 1, Ach44) records the manumission of a slave by a Jewish man named "Ioudaios." This act is considered unusual, as Jews typically did not manumit slaves within pagan temples. Given that Ioudaios translates to "Jew" in Greek and could serve as both a personal name and an ethnic identifier, it is possible that the manumitter may have been a former slave himself (perhaps adopting the ethnonym as a personal name upon gaining his freedom).

== See also ==
- Slavery in ancient Greece

== Bibliography ==
- Austin, M., "The Hellenistic World from Alexander to the Roman Conquest"
- Tucker, C.W., 1982,"Women in the Manumission Inscriptions at Delphi", Transactions of the American Philologic Association
- Sosin, J.D. "Manumission with Paramone: Conditional Freedom?", TAPA
- Bechtel, J., 1878, Sammlung Griechischer DialektInschriften, Berlin
- Andreau, J. and Descat, R., 2011 [2006]. The Slave in Greece and Rome, translated by Marion Leopold. Madison, WI.
- Bloch, M. 1914. Die Freilassungsbedingungen der delphischen Freilassungsinschriften. Diss. Straßburg.
- Duncan-Jones, R. P. 1984. “Problems of the Delphic Manumission Payments 200–1 BC.” ZPE 57: 203–9.
- Fisher, N. R. E. 2001 [1993]. Slavery in Classical Greece. London.
- Garlan, Y., 1988 [1982]. Slavery in Ancient Greece, translated by Janet Lloyd. Ithaca, NY.
