= Lesche of the Knidians =

Coordinates: 38.4831°N 22.5011°E

The Lesche of the Knidians (or Cnidians) was a lesche, i.e. a club or meeting place, at the sanctuary of Apollo in Delphi. Today, it has been mostly destroyed; the only surviving parts are some architectural relics. It hosted two famous paintings by the famous painter Polygnotus the Thasian, namely the Capture of Troy and the Nekyia. It was built in the second quarter of the 5th century BC. Apparently it was a rectangular building, bearing a clerestory along its western side, and perhaps with a tripartite interior arrangement. In the 4th century, a wall was added along its southern side for placing ex votos.

== Description ==
The Lesche of the Knidians is one of the buildings within the sanctuary of Apollo in Delphi, north of the temple of Apollo. Its renown is due to its hosting two famous paintings of the Thasian painter Polygnotus, namely the Capture of Troy (Iliou Persis) and the Nekyia (the visit of Odysseus to Hades).

The building was located on the northeast edge of the sanctuary, at an ideal spot to view both the sanctuary and the Delphic landscape. It was built on a steep slope which needed strong retaining walls to secure the grounds.

The building must have been constructed between 475 and 450 BC. According to a plausible hypothesis, the lesche was built after the Battle of the Eurymedon (467 BC), which marked the final defeat of the Persians at the Persian Wars and the liberation of the Greek cities of Asia Minor. Regarding the use of the building, it has been suggested that it functioned as a club or restaurant.

It was a rectangular structure of approximately 19 x 10 meters in size, the east–west dimension being the longer. Today, the only surviving parts of the building are a few parts of the wall, some stones on the west and east sides, and almost the entire north wall. It seems that inside the lesche there were two rows of four wooden columns, placed symmetrically to support a clerestory. This allowed natural illumination, which apparently enhanced the beauty of the paintings.

The lesche was first excavated in 1894, but without yielding any trace of the paintings.

Due to the large fragmentation of the monument, scholars are not in a position to give definitive answers regarding the entrance, the windows, the roof, and the arrangement of the paintings by Polygnotos inside the Lesche. The most likely scenario is that the two painting compositions by Polygnotos extended along the long sides of the building, the north and the south, with the entrance being located in one of the narrow sides, probably the west side. Literary sources inform us that the building had many doors; this helped reconstruct the architectural design as a building with two rooms, leading to the main room where the paintings were exhibited. The reconstruction of the façade is not definitive. The roof was gabled, covered with terracotta tiles.

Ancient sources say that as one entered the longitudinal building you could see the composition of Nekyia on the left and the composition of Iliou Persis (the "Fall of Troy") on the right. We are not in a position to know exactly how the building was lit, nor what colors Polygnotos used to create his paintings. There is also disagreement as to whether they were painted directly onto the walls (i.e. frescoes) or onto wooden slabs which were then hung on the walls. Also unknown are the height, the length and the width of the compositions. In the course of the 4th century BC, to the south of the monument was built a wall made of local limestone, on which may have been exhibited votive offerings, according to the model of the Athenian Treasury.

== Bibliography ==
- Bommelaer, J.-F., Laroche, D., Guide de Delphes. Le site, Sites et Monuments 7, Paris 1991, 202-204.
- Cousin, C., « Composition, espace et paysage dans les peintures de Polygnote à la lesché des Cnidiens », Gaia 4, 2000, 61-103.
- Jacquemin.A., Laroche, D., « Note sur quatre édifices d’époque classique à Delphes», BCH 136-137, 2012–2013, 94-105.
- Stansburry-O’Donnel, Μ., « Polygnotos’s Ilioupersis. A New Reconstruction », AJA 93, 1989, 203-215.
- Stansburry-O’Donnel, Μ., «Polygnotos’s Nekyia. A Reconstruction and Analysis», AJA 94, 1990, 213-235.
