= Georges Daux =

French archaeologist (1899–1988)

Georges Daux (21 September 1899 – 23 December 1988) was a French archaeologist and a leading scholar of Greek inscriptions.

Born in Bastia and educated at the École normale supérieure, Daux headed the French School at Athens from 1950 to 1969.

He was elected to the American Philosophical Society in 1953, Académie des Inscriptions et Belles-Lettres in 1971, and to the British Academy in 1975.
