= Bull of the Corcyreans =

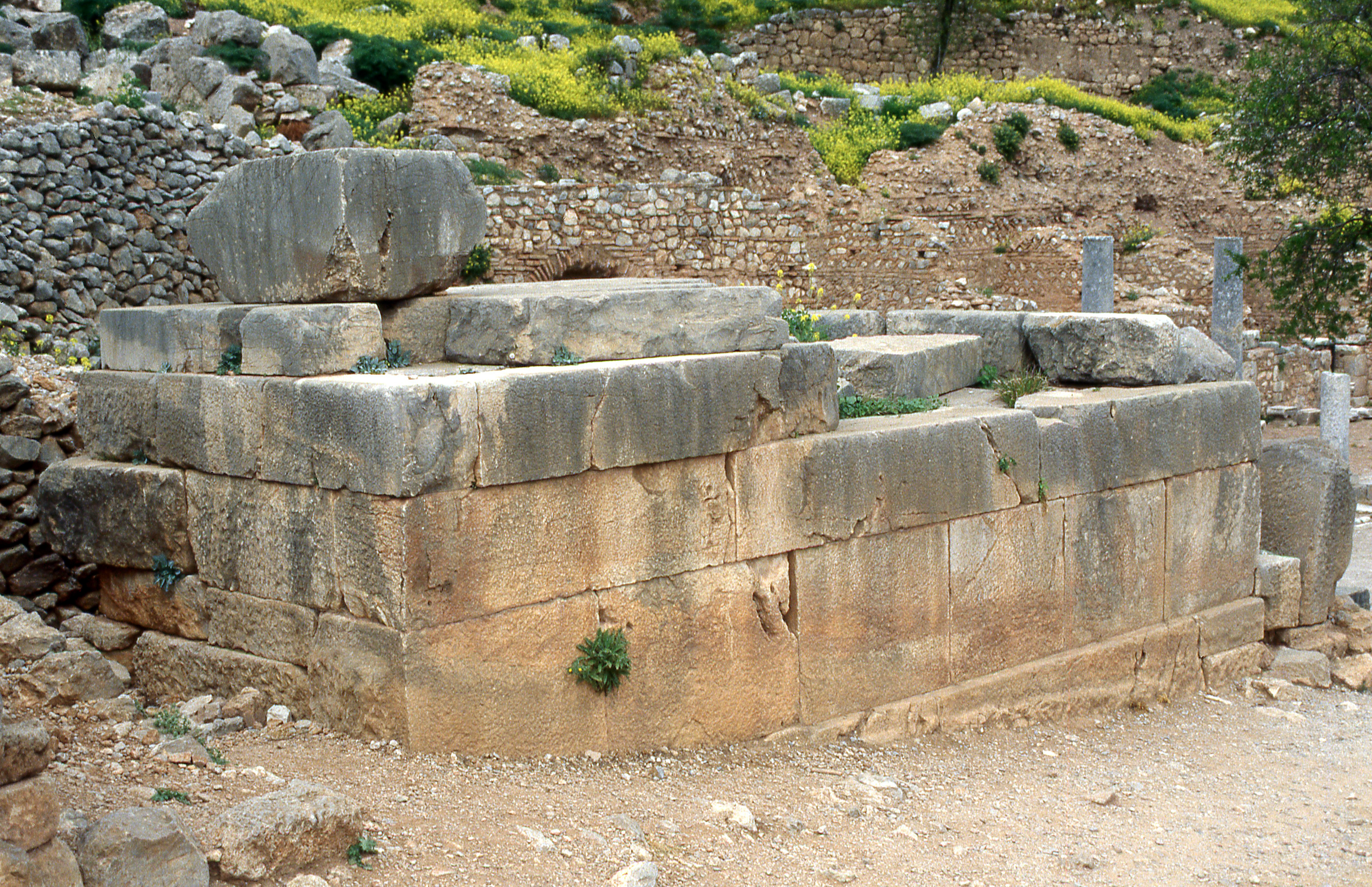
Base of the statue of the Corcyrean Bull at Delphi.

One of the most famous ex-votos in the sanctuary of Apollo in Delphi was the bronze bull dedicated by the citizens of Corfu in remembrance of a remarkable tuna fish catch.

== Description ==
On the right hand side, straight after the entrance to the sanctuary of Delphi, one sees the base of the bull that the Corcyraeans dedicated at about 480 B.C., in order to commemorate an exceptionally good catch of tuna fish. The statue was made by the sculptor Theopropus from Aegina. According to Pausanias, a bull in Corfu every day abandoned the flock and went down to the seashore, moaning. The herdsman watched him and followed him, thus noticing that the sea was full of fish. He alerted his fellow citizens and they rushed to the seashore, but they couldn't get hold of the fish. Then, they sent an envoy to the Delphic oracle and, following her advice, they sacrificed a bull to Poseidon and then caught the fish. With the tithe of the revenues they acquired by selling the fish, the Corcyreans erected the bronze bull.
