= Nicodamus (sculptor) =

Ancient Greek sculptor

Nicodamus (Ancient Greek: Νικόδαμος) was a sculptor from Maenalus (modern Mainalo) in Arcadia, who made statues of the Olympic victors Androsthenes, Antiochus of Arcadia, and Damoxenidas; one of the goddess Athena, in bronze and carrying her helmet and aegis, dedicated by the Eleans; and one of Hercules, as a youth, killing the Nemean lion with his arrows, dedicated at Olympia by Hippotion of Tarentum.

Since Androsthenes conquered in the pancration event in the 90th Olympiad, in 420 BC, the date of Nicodamus may be placed about that time. German archaeologist and art historian Johannes Overbeck placed Nicodamus in this time with certainty in his Ancient manuscript sources on the history of Greek fine arts (Die antiken Schriftquellen zur Geschichte der bildenden Künste bei den Griechen), which he wrote in 1868.
