= Hysmon =

Ancient Greek pentathlete

Hysmon (Greek: Ὕσμων) was an Ancient Greek pentathlete from Elis.

As a boy, he began to practise the pentathlon as a cure for rheumatism. He won this contest once in the Olympic games and once in the Nemean games, but was excluded from the Isthmian games as an Eleian. He also competed in the pankration, and won an Olympic victory in this event. His statue in the Altis at Olympia, representing him as holding old-fashioned halteres, was the work of Cleon.
