= Kleitomachos =

Kleitomachos (Greek: Κλειτόμαχος, variously also transliterated Cleitomachus or Clitomachus) may refer to:

- Kleitomachos (athlete), Theban athlete of the 3rd century BCE
- Clitomachus (philosopher), an Academic philosopher of the 2nd century BCE
