= Theochrestus =

Theochrestus (Ancient Greek: Θεόχρηστος) of Cyrene won a victory at Olympic games in the four-horse chariot race, and his grandfather of the same name had previously won as well, while his father won a victory at the Isthmian Games, as recorded by an inscription and reported by Pausanias, though the exact Olympiad is unknown. He bred horses according to the traditional Libyan manner.

A person of the same name is quoted by the Scholiast on Apollonius Rhodius as the author of a work on Libya; from the subject of the book, we may reasonably infer that he was a native and may have been the same as one of the Olympic victors.

Pliny the Elder in Natural History mentions a Theochrestus as an authority on the origin of amber, which he believed was washed up by the Ocean on the capes of the Pyrenees.
