= Antiochus of Arcadia =

Antiochus (Ancient Greek: Ἀντίοχος) of Arcadia was a man of ancient Greece who was the envoy sent by his state to the Persian court in 367 BCE, when embassies went to Susa from most of the Grecian states. The Arcadians, probably through the influence of Pelopidas, the Theban ambassador, were treated as of less importance than the Eleans—an affront which Antiochus resented by refusing the presents of the king.

The ancient writer Xenophon wrote that this Antiochus had conquered the ancient fighting competition called the pankration; and the historian Pausanias informs us that Antiochus, the pancratiast, was a native of Lepreum, and that he won in this contest once in the Olympic games, twice in the Nemean Games, and twice in the Isthmian Games. His statue was made by Nicodamus. Lepreum was claimed by the Arcadians as one of their towns, whence Xenophon calls Antiochus an Arcadian; but it is more usually reckoned as belonging to Elis.
