= Cleander =

Cleander or Kleandros may refer to:

- Marcus Aurelius Cleander (fl. 2nd century), Roman freedman from Phrygia, favourite and praetorian prefect of Emperor Commodus
- Cleander of Gela (fl. 5th century BC), tyrant
- Cleander of Sparta (fl. 5th to 4th century BC), harmost
- Cleander of Macedon (fl. 4th century BC), general
- Cleander of Aegina (fl. 5th century BC), son of Telesarchus pankratiast, winner in Isthmia
- Cleander of Phigalea (fl.5th-6th century BC) soothsayer from Phigalea who urged the population of Tyrins to war against the Argives
