= Anemosa (Arcadia) =

Coordinates: 37°34′18″N 22°14′19″E

Anemosa (Ancient Greek: Ἀνεμῶσα) was a village of ancient Arcadia in the district Maenalia on the Helisson.

Its site near modern Piana.
