= Telesarchus of Aegina =

Patron of Greek lyric poet Pindar

Telesarchus of Aegina (Greek: Τελέσαρχος; fl. 5th century BC) was one of the patrons of the Greek lyric poet Pindar. He is the father of the Cleander who won the boys’ pankration at the Isthmian Games sometime between 479 and 475 BC. Telesarchus's brother was the father of Nicocles, who was a champion boxer.

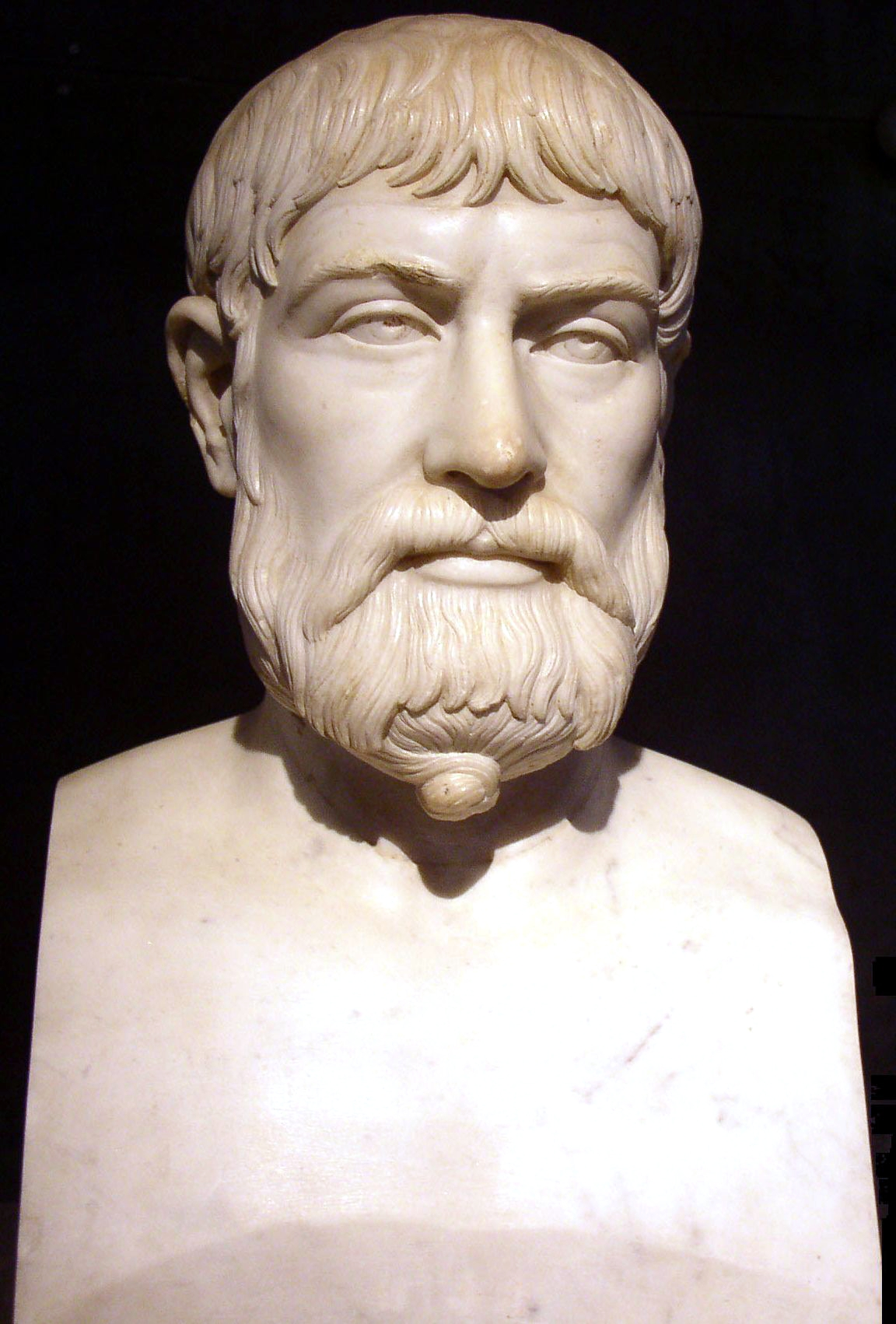
Pindar, composer of victory odes to celebrate athletic contests

Telesarchus commissioned Pindar to write a victory ode, or epinikion, celebrating his son's athletic wins at both the Nemean and the Isthmian games. His nephew, Nicocles, appears to have been a grown man whose prowess is mourned posthumously; he may have died recently in battle, since the mood of the poem also captures recent losses in the wars with Persia that included the burning of Athens and the Battle of Plataea. Pindar tempers the poem's celebratory purpose with a note of mourning:

This congratulatory ode is full of elegiac feeling for human sorrow, the outcome of human limitations. The komic procession which advances to Telesarchus' porch has a mixture of emotions to communicate. Joy is alloyed with, and deepened by, grief. The myth centres around the mortality of Achilles who, great champion though he was, could only do to others what he was ultimately destined to suffer himself.

== Sources ==
- Pindar, Isthmian Ode 8, in Anne Pippin Burnett, Pindar's Songs for Young Athletes of Aigina (Oxford University Press, 2005), Greek text and translation pp. 102–online, discussion pp. 107–118.
