= Coragus =

Warrior of the Macedonian army

Coragus (Κόραγος) of the Macedonian army was a celebrated warrior and companion of Alexander the Great. He is best known for his defeat at the hands of the Athenian Dioxippus, practitioner of pankration.

During a banquet thrown by the Macedonian emperor, Coragus challenged Dioxippus to single combat, which he accepted. Coragus attended the duel in full body armor and weaponry, including a javelin, the quintessential Macedonian long pike and a sword, while Dioxippus appeared with a simple club. Coragus threw his javelin at Dioxippus, who deftly dodged it, and as he tried to bring his pike into action his opponent shattered it with his club. Then before Coragus could drew his sword Dioxippus utilized his pankration techniques to wrestle down the Macedonian warrior. With Dioxippus' foot on his neck, Coragus was spared and released, and Dioxippus was declared the winner of the duel, much to the chagrin of the Macedonians (and the joy of the Athenians in attendance.)

Whether Coragus was involved in the later conspiracy that led to Dioxippus' suicide is unknown.
