= Artemidorus of Tralles =

Ancient Greek fighter of the 1st century CE

Artemidorus (Ancient Greek: Ἀρτεμίδωρος) of Tralles was a noted fighter of ancient Greece who lived in the 1st century CE.

He was known to have excelled at the pankration. The writer Pausanias relates that Artemidorus initially competed in the boys' division of the event, but lost owing to his having been too young. Pausanias further describes that he returned several years later and dominated the boys' division in the 212th Olympiad of the ancient Olympic Games (around 69 CE), and in the same Olympiad, after some encouragement, went on to fight and succeed in the adult division as well, emerging as the victor in the men's division. Pausanias also suggests Artemidorus was given the motivation to win after suffering some slight or insult from one of the adult competitors.

He is also mentioned in the epigrams of the writer Martial.
