= Antiphanes of Argos =

Ancient Greek sculptor

Antiphanes of Argos (Greek: Ἀντιφάνης ὁ Ἀργεῖος) was a sculptor, the disciple of Periclytus, and teacher of Cleon. Since Cleon flourished around 380 BC, Antiphanes may be placed at 400. Pausanias mentions several of his works, which were at Delphi, especially a horse in bronze.
