= Periclytus =

Greek sculptor

Periclytus, a sculptor, who belonged to the best period and to one of the best schools of Greek art, but of whom scarcely any thing is known. He is only mentioned in a single passage of Pausanias (v. 17. § 4), from which we learn that he was the disciple of Polykleitos, and the teacher of Antiphanes of Argos, who was the teacher of Cleon of Sicyon. Since Polycleitus flourished c. 440 BC, and Antiphanes c. 400 BC, the date of Periclytus may be fixed at c. 420 BC.
