= Sostratus of Sicyon =

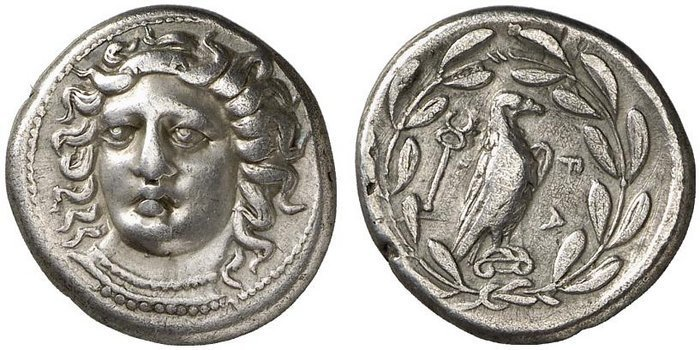
Drachma from the 105th Olympics (360 BC)

Sostratus of Sicyon (Ancient Greek: Σώστρατος, Sostratos) was an Olympic athlete and pankratiast from Sicyon in Ancient Greece, known for his style of fighting, bending or breaking his opponents fingers. He won the pankration crown at three successive Olympiads in 364, 360 and 356 BC. Further, he won 12 such victories at the Isthmian and Nemean Games combined, and two more at the Pythian Games in Delphi. According to the extant records, his feat of three Olympic victories in the pankration was equaled by only three others and surpassed by no-one in the over 1000-year history of the ancient Olympic Games.

The Canadian comedy series History Bites includes a 2002 episode titled "Five Ring Circus" (set in 350 BC) featuring Sostratos (portrayed by Sam Kalilieh) being interviewed by "David Lettermos" (Ron Pardo) about his Olympic victories.
