= Dioxippus =

Ancient Greek pankratiast

Dioxippus (Ancient Greek: Διώξιππος) was an ancient Greek athlete, renowned for his Olympic victories in the sport of pankration. His fame and skill were such that he was crowned Olympic champion by default in 336 BC when no other pankratiast dared meet him on the field. This kind of victory was called "akoniti" (literally: without getting dusted). The most famous story of Dioxippus is his victory over Coragus of the Macedonian army.

== Coragus ==
Dioxippus, by then a former pankratiast, attended a banquet hosted by Alexander the Great, who liked and respected the athlete. According to Curtius Rufus, Alexander's men mocked the guest, probably out of jealousy, and accused him of being a bit of a glutton. During the banquet, a distinguished Macedonian soldier named Coragus became drunk and belligerent, insulted Dioxippus, and challenged him to a match. Dioxippus enthusiastically and contemptuously agreed to the match. Alexander attempted to dissuade the two from fighting, but could not, due to the enthusiasm of the rest of the camp. The Macedonians supported Coragus and the rest of the Greeks supported Dioxippus.

Alexander scheduled a day for the bout. The fight is well illustrated by Curtius Rufus. Dioxippus reportedly came out well oiled and nude, carrying a purple cloak in his left hand and a heavy club in his right. Coragus, however, wore full armor, carried a bronze shield and long pike called a sarisa in his left hand, a javelin in his right hand, and wearing a side sword. During the match, the Macedonian threw his javelin, which Dioxippus dodged. Then, before Coragus could transfer his pike to his right hand, Dioxippus attacked, shattering the weapon with his club. The Macedonian attempted to draw his sword, but Dioxippus wrestled him, getting double underhooks or as Rufus described as a "bear hug", or a bodylock, swept him to the ground, disarmed him, and immobilized him. He then stepped on Coragus' throat and could have killed him, but Alexander stopped the fight at this point.

But this victory became Dioxippus' downfall. Alexander and the Macedonians were disappointed and embarrassed by the outcome of the match, particularly since their defeat occurred in front of recently conquered Persian prisoners. Alexander's disfavor was noted by the Macedonians, who conspired to embarrass Dioxippus by putting a golden cup underneath his pillow and accusing him of theft. Dioxippus felt this dishonor deeply. Realizing the Macedonians had framed him, he wrote a letter to Alexander describing the conspiracy, then committed suicide by falling on his sword. Alexander's regret at the death of Dioxippus, which he felt was unwarranted, was made even more bitter by the joyous reactions of the Macedonian camp which revealed their complicity.

This story was recorded by the ancient historians Diodorus Siculus in "Library of History" and Quintus Curtius Rufus in "The History of Alexander". Quintus Curtius Rufus discusses the Dioxippus situation in book nine, part 7, paragraphs 16-26. The story of Dioxippus, the assassination of Philip II, and the ascension of Alexander the Great are fictionalized in Peter Katsionis' novel Patrida.

== Ancient sources ==
- Curtius Rufus
- Diodorus Siculus
- Pliny the Elder
