= Arrhichion =

Champion pankratiast in the ancient Olympic Games

Arrhichion (also spelled Arrhachion, Arrichion or Arrachion) of Phigalia (Greek: Ἀρριχίων or Ἀρραχίων ὁ Φιγαλεύς) (died 564 BC) was a champion pankratiast in the ancient Olympic Games. He died while successfully defending his championship in the pankration at the 54th Olympiad (564 BC). Arrhichion has been described as "the most famous of all pankratiasts".

== History ==
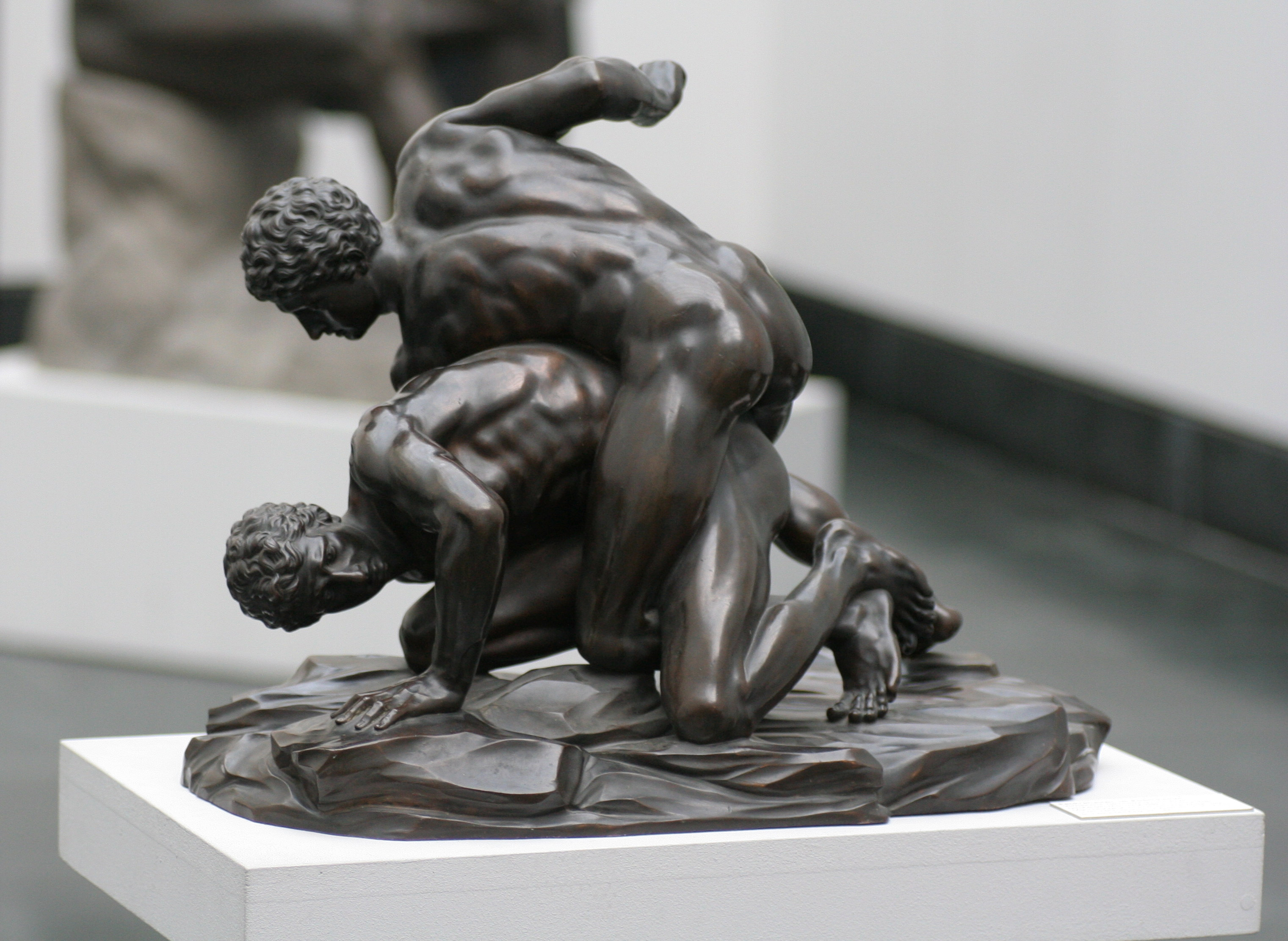
Ancient Greek pankratiasts

Arrhichion was the winner of the pankration at the 52nd and 53rd Olympiads (572 BC and 568 BC, respectively). Pankration was a martial art blending boxing and wrestling as well as kicking and holds, joint-locks and chokes on the ground, making it similar to modern MMA. Arrhichion's fatal fight was described by the geographer Pausanias and by Philostratus the Younger. According to Pausanias:

For when he was contending for the wild olive with the last remaining competitor, whoever he was, the latter got a grip first, and held Arrhachion, hugging him with his legs, and at the same time he squeezed his neck with his hands. Arrhachion dislocated his opponent's toe, but expired owing to suffocation; but he who suffocated Arrhachion was forced to give in at the same time because of the pain in his toe. The Eleans crowned and proclaimed victor the corpse of Arrhachion.

Philostratus' account is longer. In his Imagines, an imaginary tour of an art gallery, Philostratus describes a painting of Arrhichion's death. In the translation of Arthur Fairbanks:

Accordingly the antagonist of Arrichion, having already clinched him around the middle, thought to kill him; already he had wound his forearm about the other’s throat to shut off the breathing, while, pressing his legs on the groins and winding his feet one inside each knee of his adversary, he forestalled Arrichion’s resistance by choking him till the sleep of death thus induced began to creep over his senses. But in relaxing the tension of his legs he failed to forestall the scheme of Arrichion; for the latter kicked back with the sole of his right foot (as the result of which his right side was imperiled since now his knee was hanging unsupported), then with his groin he holds his adversary tight till he can no longer resist, and, throwing his weight down toward the left while he locks the latter’s foot tightly inside his own knee, by this violent outward thrust he wrenches the ankle from its socket.

Philostratus of Athens writes in his Gymnasticus that Arrichion's failure to submit to his opponent was the result of his trainer, Eryxias, shouting to him, "What a noble epitaph, 'He was never defeated at Olympia.'"

A victor statue of Arrhichion was set up at Phigalia; what is believed to be the same statue is now displayed in the museum at Olympia. It is one of the oldest dated Olympic victor statues.

== In culture ==
Arrhichion was the subject of a poem, "Arrichion", by Jeanette Threlfall, in which the poet laments the fact that the athlete lived and died before St. Paul brought Christianity to Greece.

== In popular culture ==
Arrhichion's fatal fight may have been parodied in Monty Python and The Holy Grail, where the Black Knight has all his limbs chopped off by King Arthur but refuses to give up. According to a DVD commentary, John Cleese was told the story in an English class with the moral of the story being "if you never give up, you can't possibly lose" and it always struck him as being "a very dodgy conclusion".
