= Aristocleidas =

Ancient Greek athlete

Aristocleidas (Ancient Greek: Ἀριστοκλείδας) of Aegina was an athlete of ancient Greece. He was a noted Greek pancratiast. He was celebrated for his Nemean victories and became a subject of Pindar's ode, where he was compared to Herakles and Aeacus.

== Life ==
Aristocleidas was the son of Aristophanes, and won the victory in the Pankration in the adult division of the Nemean Games, but it is not known in what Olympiad. Classical scholar Georg Ludolf Dissen conjectures that this was before the Battle of Salamis, that is, before 480 BCE. The third Nemean Ode of Pindar was written in Aristocleidas's honor, and in which Pindar claims Aristocleidas had attained the highest glory mortals can achieve. In Pindar's ode, he was cited for winning the Pankration thrice: as a boy at Megara, as a young man at Epidaurus; and, at Nemea during his advanced years. In 475, during the third Nemean, Aristocleidas won the pancratiast competition.

Dutch classical scholar Ilja Leonard Pfeijffer has suggested that the ode indicates that Aristocleidas won his victory without using the services of a professional trainer, which would have been fairly unusual at the time. Other scholars, such as Nigel James Nicholson, disagree with this interpretation and go so far as to say the ode may even be metaphorical, not representing a contemporaneous athletic victory, but a political one. This would be similar to the eleventh Nemean Ode, in which Pindar celebrates the election of Aristagoras to the local prytaneion (a governing body) while also referencing his athletic triumphs as a young man.

== Others with this name ==
The Neoplatonist philosopher Iamblichus refers to a "Aristocleidas of Tarentum", who lived around the 5th century BCE, who was an adherent of Pythagoreanism, and about whom no more is known.
