= Falanthos =

Falanthos Φάλανθος
- Municipal unit
- Location within the regional unit

- Location within Greece
- Coordinates: 37°34′N 22°15′E
- Country: Greece
- Administrative region: Peloponnese
- Regional unit: Arcadia
- Municipality: Tripoli

Area
  - Municipal unit: 208.5 km^{2} (80.5 sq mi)

Population (2021)
  - Municipal unit: 405
  - Municipal unit density: 1.94/km^{2} (5.03/sq mi)
- Time zone: UTC+2 (EET)
  - Summer (DST): UTC+3 (EEST)
- Vehicle registration: TP

Falanthos (Greek: Φάλανθος) is a former municipality in Arcadia, Peloponnese, Greece. Since the 2011 local government reform it is part of the municipality Tripoli, of which it is a municipal unit. The municipal unit has an area of 208.545 km^{2}.

== Subdivisions ==
The municipal unit Falanthos is subdivided into the following communities (constituent villages in brackets):

- Alonistaina
- Chrysovitsi (Chrysovitsi, Manteika)
- Mainalo
- Piana
- Roeino
- Silimna
- Tselepakos (Tselepakos, Davia, Kato Davia)

== Population ==
Year	Population
1991	1,296
2001	1,310
2011	402
2021	405
