= Chrysovitsi =

Chrysovitsi Χρυσοβίτσι
- Community
- Location within Greece
- Coordinates: 37°33′N 22°13′E
- Country: Greece
- Administrative region: Peloponnese
- Regional unit: Arcadia
- Municipality: Tripoli
- Municipal unit: Falanthos

Population (2021)
  - Community: 44
- Time zone: UTC+2 (EET)
  - Summer (DST): UTC+3 (EEST)
- Vehicle registration: TP

Chrysovitsi (Greek: Χρυσοβίτσι) is a mountain village and a community in the municipal unit of Falanthos, Arcadia, Greece. The community includes the village Mantaiika, 5 km southeast of Chrysovitsi. Built on the slopes of Mainalo at 1,100 m, Chrysovitsi is one of the highest villages in the Peloponnese. It is a traditional settlement since November 23, 1998 (Law 908D) and its code number is 12317201. Chrysovitsi is 4 km southwest of Piana, 7 km northeast of Lykochia, 11 km east of Stemnitsa and 15 km northwest of Tripoli.

The village is on the slope of the mountain, overlooking a valley and karstic plain.

Forest fires are a permanent threat in the Mainalo mountains.

== Population ==
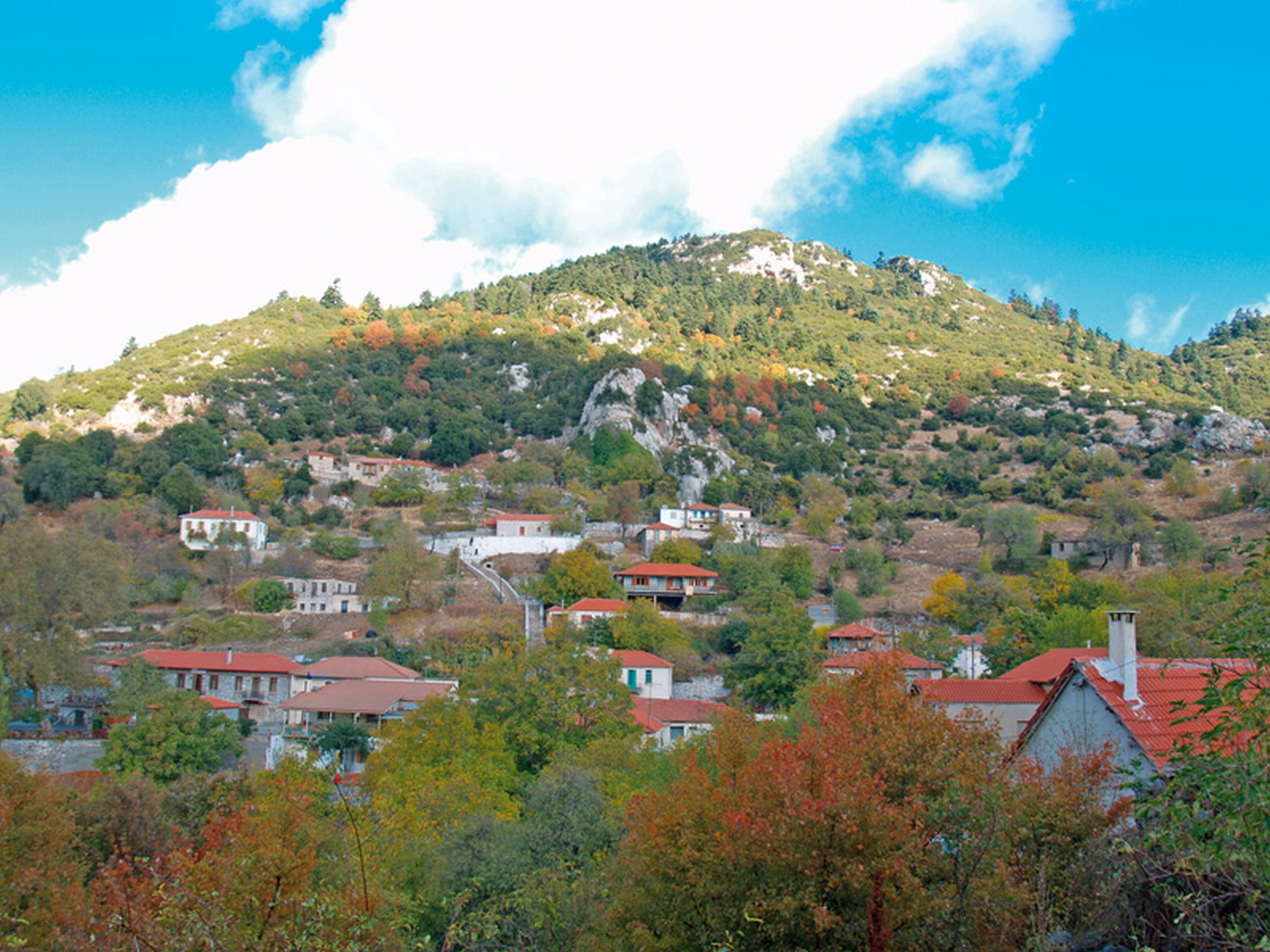
The village at the slope

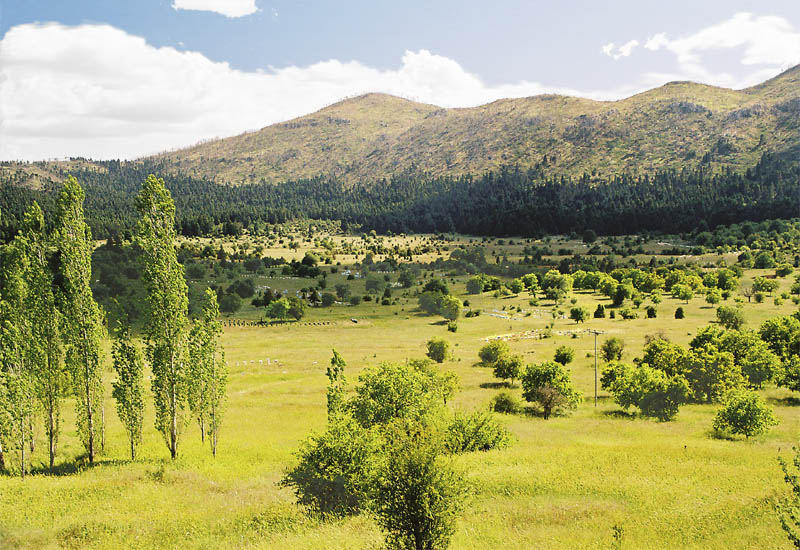
The village overlooks the small green plain

Year	Population
1981	187
1991	183
2001	196
2011	58
2021	44

== History ==
The settlement dates back to the 15th century. Around 1700, it was mentioned as Chrissovizzi under the Venetian census and later Xovitzi (Ξοβίτζι). The village was a center of Greek rebellion during the Greek Revolution of 1821. The revolutionary leader Theodoros Kolokotronis grew up in nearby Limpovisi. In 1935, a lumbermill was built, which was operated until 1972. It is now used as a museum by the Forest Council. In 1997, the formerly independent community joined the municipality of Falanthos.

== Song Archives of Sam Chianis, PhD ==
Noted ethnomusicologist Sam Chianis, PhD (Σωτηριος Τσιανης) made many trips to Greece in his academic career to catalogue recordings of folk songs as sung and played by locals of various regions. His extensive archive include hundreds of songs from Chrysovitsi alone that was amassed from 2 trips: early 1959 (over 400 songs) and summer 1969 (approximately 110 songs).

Dr Chianis' music library is considered culturally significant and he has shared his collection for posterity with several institutions including the Academy of Athens.

== Chicago Organization ==
The Chrysovitsi Society of Chicago (officially The Benevolent Society of Saint Mary, Chrysovitsi) was formed in the 1950s and hosts social events including an annual 4 July picnic a northern suburb of Chicago. Funds are raised to benefit philanthropic projects in Chrysovitsi.

== See also ==
- Karst
- Plateau
- List of settlements in Arcadia
- List of traditional settlements of Greece
