= Dipaea =

Coordinates: 37°32′38″N 22°16′23″E

Dipaea or Dipaia (Ancient Greek: Δίπαια) was a town of ancient Arcadia in the district Maenalia, through whose territory flowed the river Helisson (present Elissonas), a tributary of the Alpheius. Its inhabitants removed to Megalopolis on the foundation of the latter city (371 BCE). It is frequently mentioned on account of a battle fought in its neighbourhood between the Lacedaemonians and all the Arcadians except the Mantineians, sometime between 479 and 464 BCE.

Its site is located west of the modern Davia, near Piana.
