= Alonistaina =

Alonistaina Αλωνίσταινα
- Community
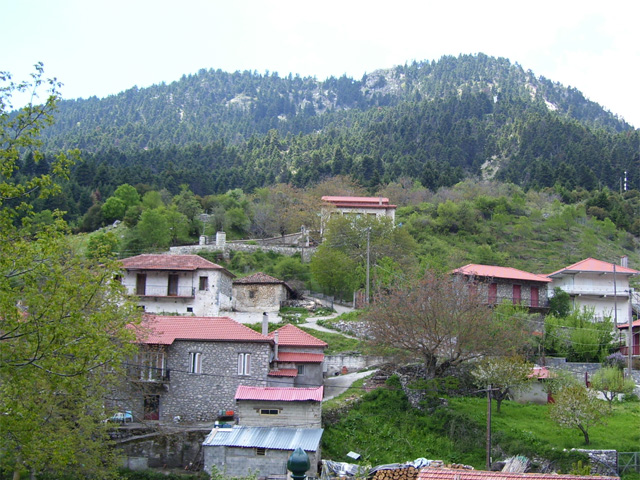

- Location within Greece
- Coordinates: 37°37.5′N 22°13.3′E
- Country: Greece
- Administrative region: Peloponnese
- Regional unit: Arcadia
- Municipality: Tripoli
- Municipal unit: Falanthos
- Elevation: 1,220 m (4,000 ft)

Population (2021)
  - Community: 64
- Time zone: UTC+2 (EET)
  - Summer (DST): UTC+3 (EEST)
- Postal code: 221 00
- Area code: 2710
- Vehicle registration: TP

Alonistaina (Greek: Αλωνίσταινα) is a mountain village in the municipal unit of Falanthos, Arcadia, Greece. It is situated in the forested northern Mainalo mountains, at about 1,220 m. elevation, making it one of the highest villages in the Peloponnese. It is considered a traditional settlement and is situated 6 km north of Piana, 6 km southeast of Vytina, 9 km southwest of Levidi and 18 km northwest of Tripoli. Alonistaina has a school and a church (Agia Paraskevi).

== Description ==
The village in the Mainalo mountains is one of the highest villages of Arcadia, Peloponnese. Kefalovriso is the largest karst spring in the area; it is dedicated to Saint Nicholas.

== Historical population ==
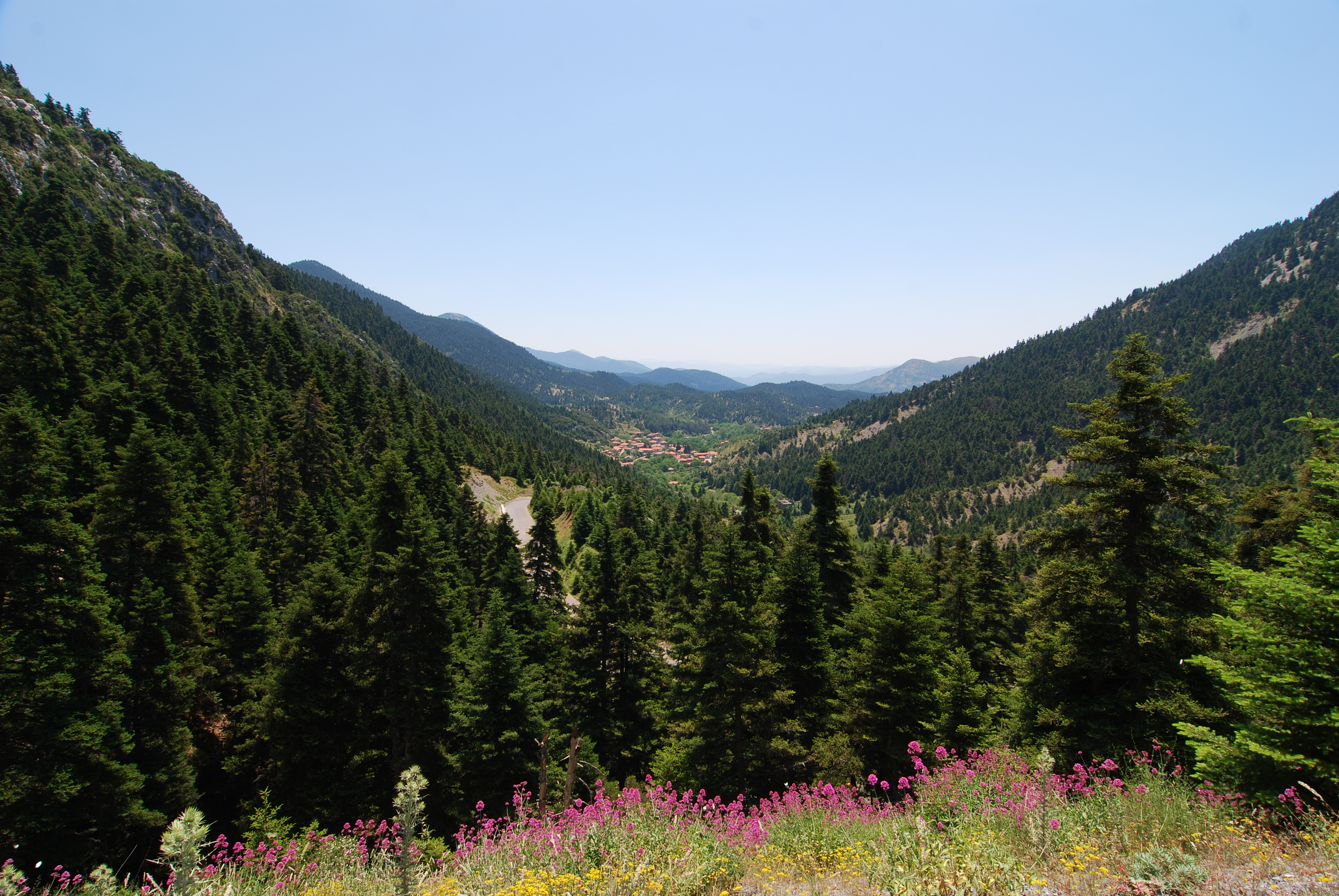
Alonistaina village from Mount Mainalon

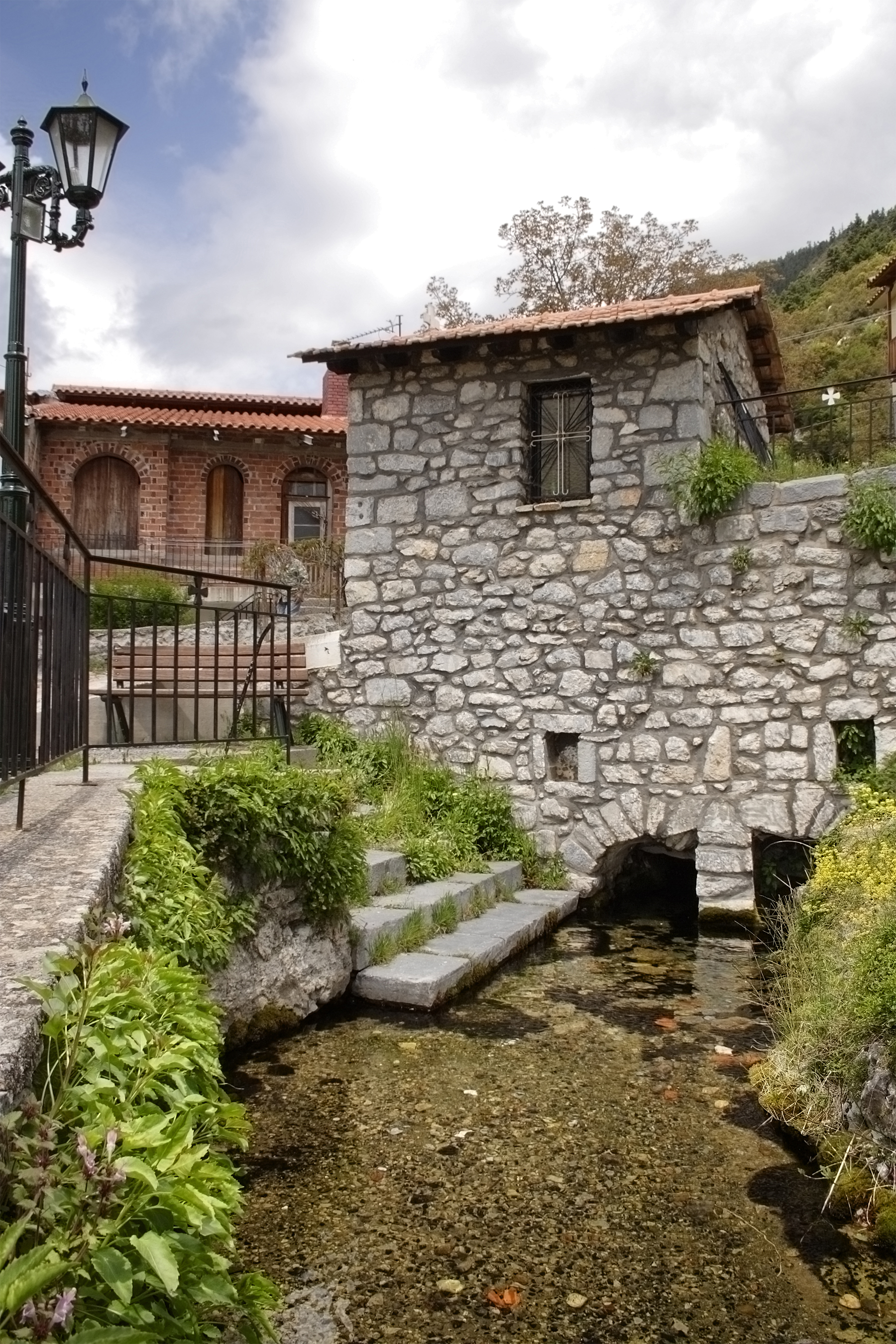
Karst spring at the slopes of Mainalo mountains

Year	Population
1981	137
1991	148
2001	117
2011	57
2021	64

== Notable people ==
- Birthplace of Zambia Kolokotroni-Kotsaki, mother of Theodoros Kolokotronis, a general in the Greek War of Independence.
- Birthplace of Theodoros Tourkovasilis, politician.

== See also ==
- Limestone
- List of settlements in Arcadia
- List of traditional settlements of Greece
