= Ex voto of Daochos =

4th century statue group in Delphi Museum

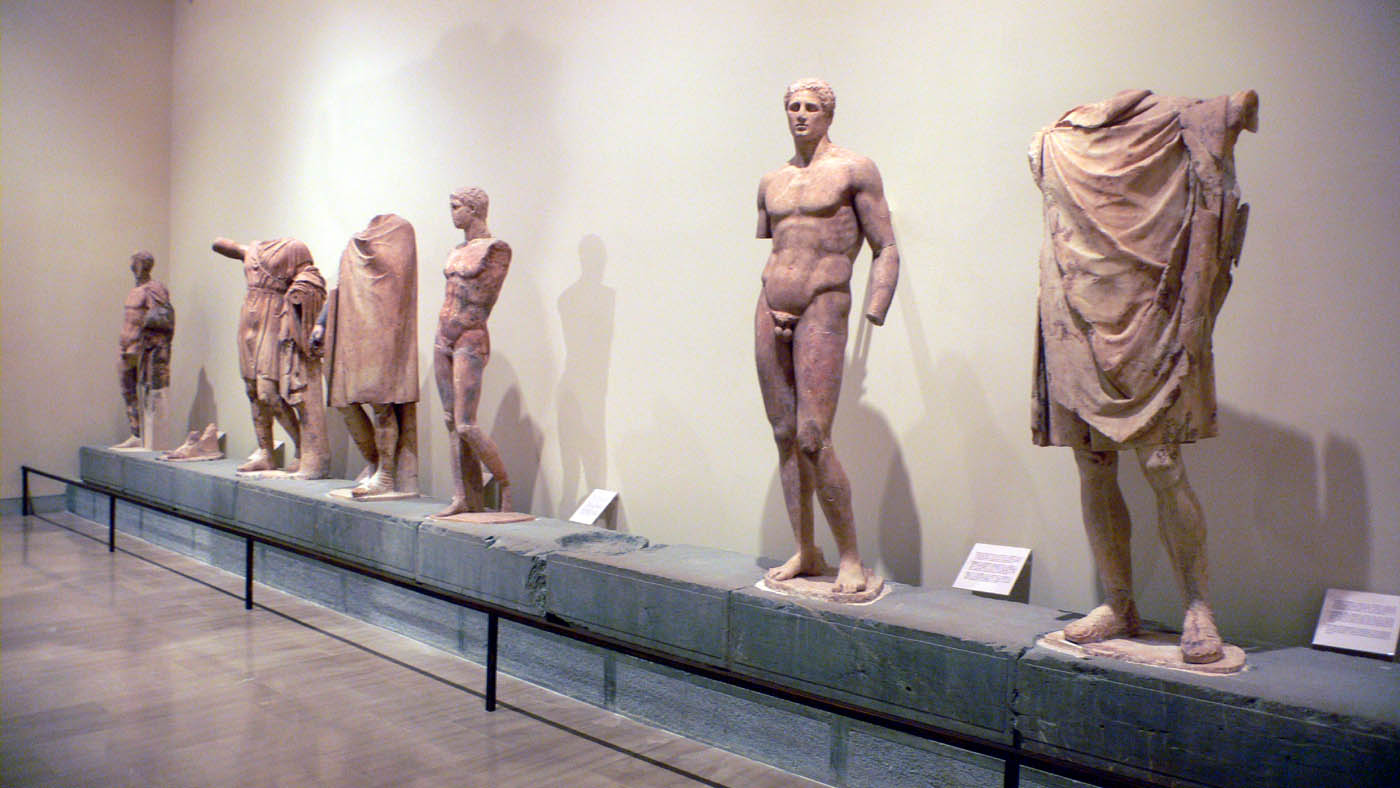
The ex voto of Daochos at the Delphi Archaeological Museum

Behind the column with the Dancers of Delphi was situated the Athenian Treasury, where was located the famous ex voto of Daochos (Ανάθημα του Δαόχου, "vow of Daochos"), a long marble base where stood nine statues, eight of which represented members of Daochos' family and one a god, probably Apollo. Daochos II, son of Agias, a politician from Pharsalus and supporter of Macedonia, was a hieromnemon at the delphic sanctuary from 336 to 332 B.C. He dedicated the ex voto as a sign of honour to his prominent family.

== Description ==
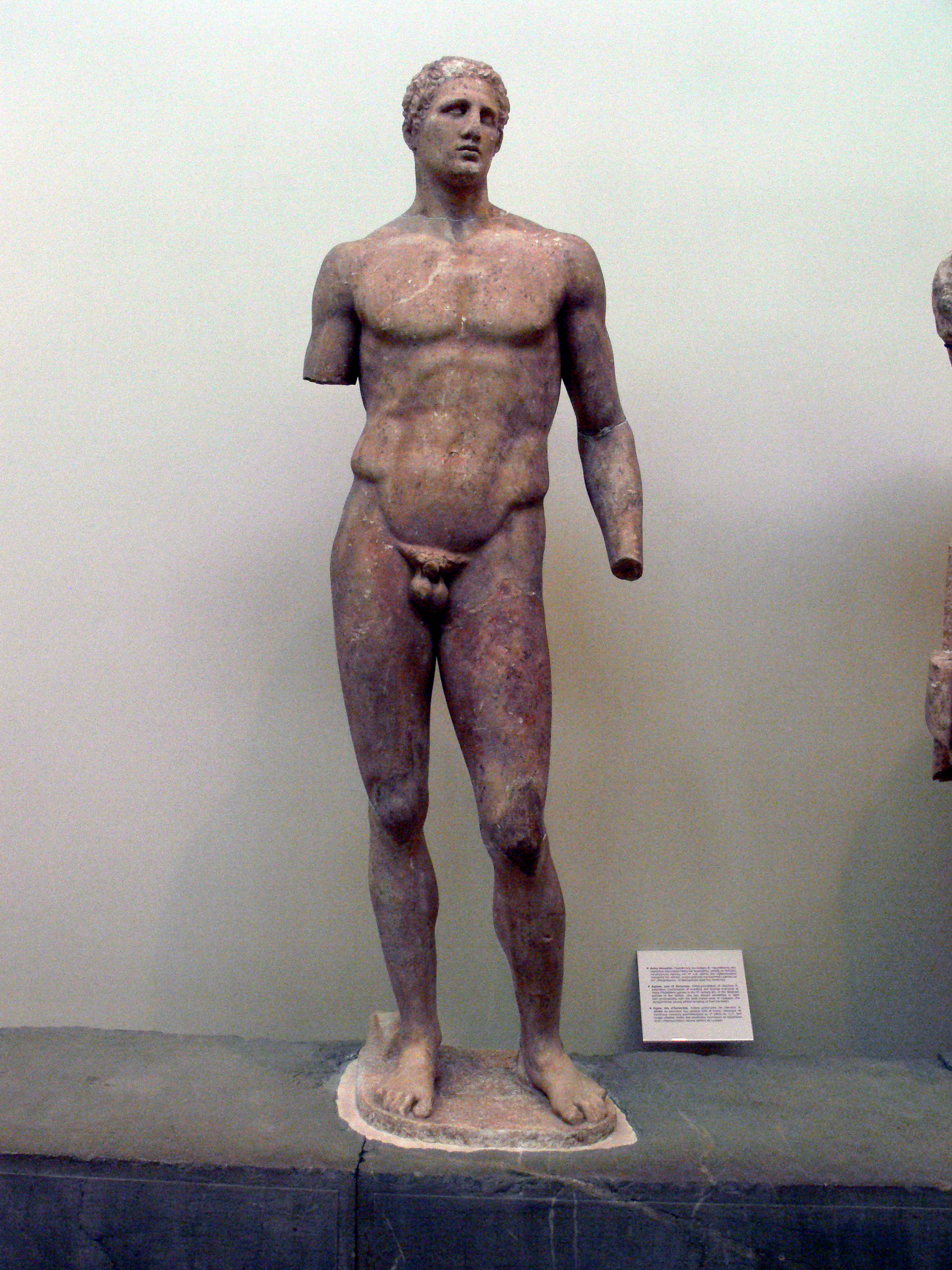
A statue of Agias, son of Acnonius, and winner of the pankration in three Panhellenic Games. This statue occupies Position III of the Ex voto of Daochos. Height: 2 metres (6 feet 7 inches)

The ex voto of Daochos was the sculpted ex voto of the tetrarch of Thessaly Daochos II to the god Apollo, which had been placed in the Treasury of the Thessalians to the northeast of the temple of Apollo in Delphi. The ex voto dates probably between 339 and 334 B.C., in the time when Daochos II was hieromnemon of Pharsalus in the Delphic Amphictyony. Other dates have, however, been proposed. Initially it was thought that the ex voto stood free. However, recent studies concluded that the monument was probably situated within the Treasury of the Thessalians, built around 361 B.C. by Agelaus. The ex voto had the form of a sculpted complex comprising nine figures: eight members of the family of Daochos and one of a god, possibly of Apollo. All figures were accompanied by inscriptions which facilitated their identification. Only the god's figure does not bear an inscription. The figures presented are those of Acnonius, Agias, Telemachus, Agelaus, Daochus I, Sisyphus I, Daochus II and Sisyphus II. The presence of Agias in this group led the scholars to attribute the entire complex to the workshop of Lysippus, as the latter had created a statue of the Thessalian leader in Pharsalus.

=== Position I ===
The statues were found fragmented during the Great Excavations, in 1894. In Position I stood the statue of Apollo, as established by Prof. E. Will. The god was apparently depicted seated and holding the lyre.

=== Position II ===
In Position II stood Acnonius, as attested by the inscription: Ἀκνόνιος Ἀπάρου τέτραρχος Θεσσαλῶν. Acnonius was the great ancestor of the house of Daochos.

=== Position III ===
In position III was found the inscription:

Πρῶτος Ὀλύμπια παγκράτιον, Φαρσάλιε νίκᾳς, Ἁγία Ἀκνονίου, γῆς ἀπὸ Θεσσαλίας, Πεντάκις ἐν Νεμέᾳ, τρὶς Πύθια, πεντάκις Ἰσθμοῖ καὶ σῶν οὐδείς πω στῆσε τρόπαια χερῶν.

It refers to Agias, son of Acnonius, who had won at the pankration in three Panhellenic Games. The statue is attributed to Lysippus.

=== Position IV ===
In position IV one reads the inscription:

Κἀγὼ τοῦδε ὁμάδελφο[ς ἔ]φυν, ἀριθμὸν δὲ τὸν αὐτὸν ἤμασι τοῖς αὐτοῖς ἐχφ[έρ]ομαι στεφάνων νικῶν μουνοπάλ[ης], Τ[υρ]σηνῶν δὲ ἄνδρα κρατίστον κτεῖνα ἐθέλοντο[ς ἑοῦ Τ]ηλέμαχος δ’ ὄνομα.

It mentions the wrestler Telemachus, who was no inferior to Agias in victories.

=== Position V ===
In position V the inscription runs:

Οἳδε μὲν ἀθλοφόρου ῥώμης ἴσον ἔσχον, ἐγὼ δε σύγγονος ἀμφοτέρων τῶνδε Ἀγέλαος ἔφυν νικῶ δὲ στάδιον τούτοις ἃμα Πύθια παῖδας μοῦνοι δὲ θνητῶν τούσδ’ ἔχομεν στεφάνους.

It refers to Agelaus, the younger brother, who had won at the children's race at the Pythian Games.

=== Position VI ===
Position VI was dedicated to Daochos I, son of Agias, who governed Thessaly for 27 years, offering Thessaly a period of flourishment. This is attested by the inscription:

Δάοχος Ἁγία εἰμί, πατρὶς Φάρσαλος ἁπάσης Θεσσαλίας ἄρξας, οὐ βίᾳ ἀλλὰ νόμῳ ἑπτὰ καὶ εἴκοσι ἔτη, πολλῇ δὲ καὶ ἀγλαοκάρπῳ εἰρήνη πλούτῳ τε ἔβρυε Θεσσαλία.

=== Position VII ===
In position VII runs the inscription:

Οὐκ ἔψευσε σε Παλλὰς ἐν ὕπνῳ, Δαόχου υἱὲ Σίσυφε, ἅ δ’ εἶπε σαφή θῆκεν ὑποσχεσίαν ἐξ οὐ γὰρ τὸ πρῶτον ἔδυς περὶ τεύχεα χρωτί οὔτ’ ἔφυγες δηίους οὔτε τι τραῦμ' ἔλαβες.

Athena is praised for having pleaded to Sisyphus to offer him bravery and to protect him in battle. Sisyphus I was the son of Daochos I.

=== Position VIII ===
In position VIII the inscription goes:

Αὔξων οἰκείων προγόνων ἀρετὰς τάδε δῶρα στῆσεμ Φοίβῳ ἄνακτι, γένος καὶ πατρίδα τιμῶν, Δάοχος εὐδόξῳ χρώμενος εὐλογία, Τέτραρχος Θεσσαλῶν, ἱερομνήμων Ἀμφικτυόνων.

According to the inscription, the dedicator Daochos II, Tetrarch of the Thessalians and hieromnemon dedicates these statues to Apollo. His statue is not preserved apart from the feet (εικ.9).

=== Position IX ===
The final position IX was reserved for Daochos II's son, who apparently was too young to write something memorable for him.

== General and cited references ==
- Adam, Sh., "The technique of Greek sculpture in the archaic and classical periods", BSA συμπλήρωμα έκδοσης τ.3 (1966)
- Arnold, D., 1969 Die Polykletnachfolge, Berlin
- Brown, B., 1973, Anticlassicism in Greek Sculpture of the Fourth Century B. C., New York
- Collignon, M., 1905, Lysippe, Παρίσι
- Croissant, F., 1974, "Delphes, IΙ. Sculptures", BCH 98, pp. 785–788
- Dittenberger, G., 1960, Sylloge Inscriptionurn Graecarum, τ.1, Hildesheim
- Dohrn, T., 1968, "Die Marmor Standbilder des Daochos Weihgeschenks in Delphi", Antike Plastik, v.8, 33-53
- Amandry, P., Chamoux, F., 1991, Guide de Delphes, Le Musée, Παρίσι
- Evans, K.E., 1996, The Daochos Monument, Michigan
- Homolle, Th., 1894, "Découvertes de Delphes", Gazette des Beaux-Arts, 3rd series, v.12, pp. 441–454
- Homolle, Th., 1898, "La date de l’ex-voto des Thessaliens", BCH 22, p. 633
- Jacob-Felsch, M., 1969, Die Entwicklung griechischer Statuenbasen und die Aufstellung der Statuen, Waldsassen/Bayern
- Jacquemin, A., Laroche, D., 2001, Le monument de Daochos ou le Trésor des Thessaliens, BCH 125, 2001, pp. 305–332
- Johnson, F.P., 1968, Lysippos, New York
- Marcadé, J ., 1953, Recueil des signatures de sculpteurs grecs, v.1, Paris
- Pouilloux, J ., 1976, Fouilles de Delphes. (Épigraphie. Fassicule IV. Les inscriptions de la terrasse du temple et de la région nord du sanctuaire) v.3, Paris
- Ridgway, B.S., "Die Thessalischer Grabreliefs-Studien zur Nordgriechischen Kunst, by Hagen Biesantz", AJA 71 (1967) σ.99-101
- Ridgway, B.S., 1990, Hellenistic Sculpture I. The styles of ca. 331-200 B. C., Bristol
- Sjöqvist, E., 1996, Lysippus, Cincinnati
- Stewart, A.F., 1978, "Lysippan Studies. 2. Agias and Oilpourer", AJA 82, pp. 301–313
- Thémélis, P., 1979, "Contribution à l’étude de l’ex-voto delphique de Daochos" BCH 103, pp. 507–520
- Will, E., 1938, "À propos de la base des Thessaliens à Delphes", BCH 62, pp. 289–304, table 30-32
