= Mainalo, Arcadia =

Mainalo Μαίναλο
- Community
- Location within Greece
- Coordinates: 37°32′10″N 22°18′29″E
- Country: Greece
- Administrative region: Peloponnese
- Regional unit: Arcadia
- Municipality: Tripoli
- Municipal unit: Falanthos

Population (2021)
  - Community: 28
- Time zone: UTC+2 (EET)
  - Summer (DST): UTC+3 (EEST)

Mainalo (Greek: Μαίναλο) is a village in the municipal unit of Falanthos, Arcadia, Greece. It is situated at 880 m elevation, south of Mainalo mountain, and northwest of Tripoli.

== Historical population ==
Year	Population
1981	105
1991	78
2001	65
2011	46
2021	28
