= Cleon (sculptor) =

Ancient Greek sculptor, fl. c. 380 BCE

Cleon (Greek: Κλέων Σικυώνιος, fl. around 380 BCE) was an Ancient Greek sculptor of Sicyon. He was a pupil of Antiphanes, who had been taught by Periclytus, a follower of the great Polykleitos of Argos.

Cleon's age is determined by two bronze statues of Zeus at Olympia executed after the 98th Olympiad, and another of Deinolochus, after the 102nd Olympiad. He excelled in portrait-statues of which several athletic ones are mentioned by Pausanias.
