= Kleitomachos (athlete) =

Ancient Greek sportsman

Kleitomachos (Greek: Κλειτόμαχος, variously also transliterated Cleitomachus or Clitomachus) was a Theban athlete considered a formidable boxer. His achievements were recounted by Pausanias, who notes that he won the pankration and boxing at the 141st and 140th Olympiad in 216 and 212BC respectively, the pankration at three Pythian Games, and the wrestling, boxing, and pankration at an Isthmian Games all on the same day. This latter achievement, victory in all three so-called "downing" events, was regarded as especially impressive, and was only achieved by one other athlete (Theagenes of Thasos). Centuries later, Aelian praised Kleitomachos for his temperance, holding it to be the key to his athletic prowess. In particular, he noted Kleitomachos' abstinence from sex, saying that he would even avert his eyes if he saw two dogs coupling.
