= Piana, Arcadia =

Piana Πιάνα
- Community
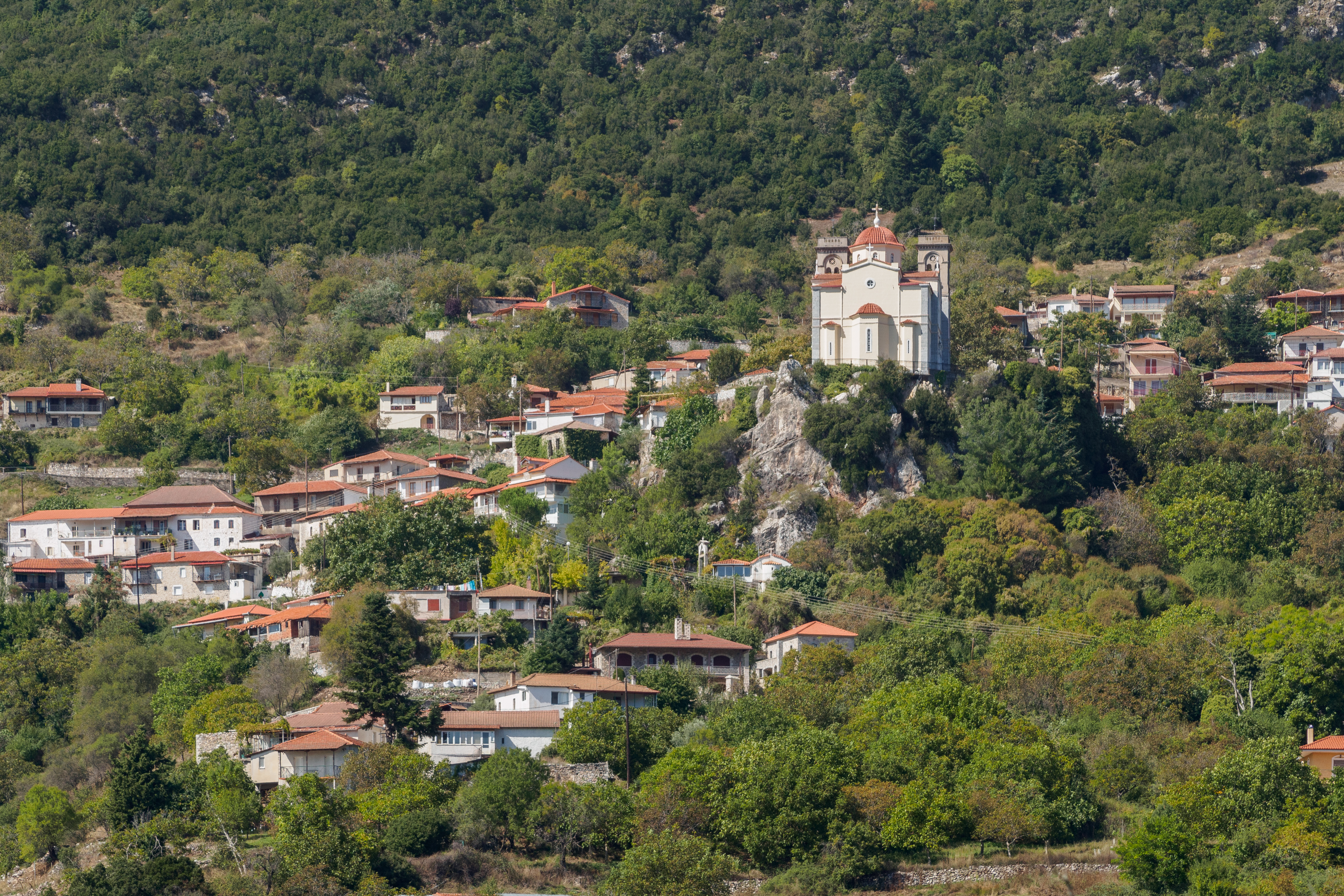

- Location within Greece
- Coordinates: 37°34′27″N 22°14′17″E
- Country: Greece
- Administrative region: Peloponnese
- Regional unit: Arcadia
- Municipality: Tripoli
- Municipal unit: Falanthos

Population (2021)
  - Community: 57
- Time zone: UTC+2 (EET)
  - Summer (DST): UTC+3 (EEST)

Piana (Greek: Πιάνα) is a historical village of Arcadia and one of the traditional Greek villages of Peloponnese. It is built at the Mainalo mountain, near the ruins of the ancient city Dipaia (Greek: Διπαία). Its population was 57 at the 2021 census.

The name of Piana is connected with the mythological god Pan (modern Greek: Πάνας), who, according to the ancient Greek mythology, had the legs of the goat under his human body. Piana belongs to the province of Mantineia and constitutes today a municipal department of the municipality of Falanthos.

== Locality and access to Piana ==
Piana is built in sides of mountain range of Mainalo in altitude of 1090 metres and with Eastern report. The distance from Athens is roughly 190 kilometres that are covered by road in roughly two hours. Piana is found in southernly the capital of Prefecture Arkadia, that is Tripoli, and it abstains from this 19 kilometres. The access in the village becomes following the road axis Tripoli-Alonistaina-Vytina, following the bypass to the left in the 18th km, through a green forest route which crosses the evergreen region of Mainalo.

In the square of Piana dominates the church of Saint Georgios. The church is built on imposing rock in the centre of village. The church of Saint Georgios is a basilica with three aisles, a dome and two splendidly stonebuild belfries. The trunke of church is from stone and during Ottoman domination, it was a castle.

Piana is a member village of the municipality of Falanthos, which is a subdivision of the municipality of Tripoli since 2010. It is very close to the other villages of Falanthos like Alonistaina, Chrysovitsi, Roeino, Davia, Zarakova, Mantaiika, Tselepakos and Silimna. Moreover, visitors of the very famous nearby destinations like Vitina, Stemnitsa and Dimitsana can easily visit Piana.

== The role of Piana during the Greek Revolution of 1821 ==
At the revolution of 1821 the village played decisive role due to difficulties to access. For this reason the region around Piana constituted the ideal den for the Armatoloi and Kleftes.

In Piana were organised by Theodoros Kolokotronis the first military departments that strengthened the battle of Valtetsi and dominated over Turks in Tripolitsa later on. The name of Piana is historically unbreakably connected with the catering of Kolokotronis armed forces with the essentials for their winning battles.

In the courtyard of another beautiful church of the village, named Panagitsa Polykammeni, because of the repeatedly Turk's efforts to ruin it with fire, it is saved today a traditional wood-oven. By the ovens of Piana the Greek camps of revolution, were provided with bread .

== Limpovisi ==
In distance of 7 kilometres of westwards Piana is found the historical Limpovisi (Greek: Λιμποβίσι). It is the Homeland of Kolokotronis' Family and the natural space in which he grew during his childhood and also acted Theodoros Kolokotronis or Geros Tou Moria(Greek: Γέρος Του Μωριά). At the inventory of Enetoi(Greek: Ενετοί) in 1711 were recorded 500 residents at Limpovisi. Nowadays at Limpovisi, the House of Kolokotronis family has been restored and functions as a museum. In the courtyard of Limpovisi also exists the country church of Ai-Yannis(Greek: Άι-Γιάννης).

The wider space of Limpovisi was reformed with donation of the unforgettable Panagiotis Aggelopoulos in the year 1990. In the square functions also municipal refreshment stand.

== Arkoudorevma ==
In small distance from Limpovisi, is found the depopulated village Arkoudorevma (Greek: Αρκουδόρευμα). Arkoudorevma belonged to the community of Piana, and was abolished as a settlement in 1928. Deep in the gorge of Arkoudorevma, ruins of the old Arkoudorevma houses are saved until today.

Worthseeing is also the renovated stone tap of Arkoudorevma, that is found very near to the church of Virgin Mary of Arkoudorevma. The church of Virgin Mary of Arkoudorevma was built in 1719.

The waters from the Arkoudorevma gorge meet with those of the Elissonas which crosses the plain of Piana.

Arkoudorevma is of equal historical importance with that of Limpovisi, because his embossed territory it constituted also this place suitable for reorganization of armed forces before the historical battles of 1821.

== The Folklore Museum of Piana ==
The village contains the Folklore Museum of Piana.

This exhibits are constituted by infrequent collections of utensiles and vessels and are related with the daily life of previous generations of Piana residents, religious and ecclesiastical heirlooms, as well as samples of martial equipment of the fighters of the Greek Revolution of 1821.

The exclusive assiduity and support of this effort came solely from the Papanikolas Institution Beneficial to the Public.

== The Elissonas River ==
The plain of Piana is crossed by the Elissonas River. The waters of Elissonas river gush from the sources of the foot of Pianovouni and it gives life to the very few residents of region that cultivate the ground or raise their animals. Important part of these sources' water of Elisson River is collected for the water supply of the residents of Tripolis, the Capital of the Arkadian prefecture.

In the middle of the plain of Piana, the waters of the Elissonas river are deep in the ground, and it is believed that they appear again in the region of Megalopolis. On the length of the Elissonas there used to be 12 stone watermills for the grinding of cereals of the region and 6 traditional stone washing factories (Greek: Νεροτριβή) for the washing of heavy clothing. Some of these buildings are still in very good situation.

== The Pianovouni Mountain and Pan ==
In the mountain that is found above the sources of Elisson river that called Pianovouni(Greek: Πιανοβούνι), is found the cave of the god Pan. The local fable, wants Pan to live in this cave and with his flute to flood with magic sounds the marvelous ravine of the Elisson Sources.

Also, the etymology of name of Piana is brought to be connected with the God Panas.

== Main cultivation and the products of Piana ==
The main products are potatoes, walnuts, tomatoes, courgettes, cauliflowers and beans.

Traditionally Piana was very famous for the high production of apples and constituted very important income for the local economy. Particularly acquaintance was the cultivated variety Delicious Pilafa Tripoleos Apples (Greek: Μήλα Τριπόλεως). Today the cultivation of the apple trees has been minimized in total and just meets the needs of the Piana residents. The main causes that the culture of apple trees were abandoned, particularly the variety Pilafa Delicious, is related to the increased needs of trees in farming care as well as in not guaranteed and unstable output from year-to-year mainly due to the unfavourable meteorological conditions or the apple trees diseases.

Moreover, because a very important part of the ground of Piana as well as of the wider region, is covered with firs, it is produced honey of fir of high quality (Greek: Μέλι Ελάτης) as well as the acquaintance for the flavour of Honey of Fir Mainalou Vanilla(Greek: Μέλι Ελάτης Μαινάλου Βανίλια).

== The Weather Conditions of Piana ==
The climate of Piana is mountainous. During the winter there are enough rainfalls, snowfalls and frost, while in the summertime are presented big fluctuations in the temperature of day-night.

== See also ==
- List of settlements in Arcadia
- List of traditional settlements of Greece
