= Isthmian Games =

Panhellenic game of Ancient Greece

Isthmian Games or Isthmia (Ancient Greek: Ἴσθμια) were one of the Panhellenic Games of Ancient Greece, and were named after the Isthmus of Corinth, where they were held. As with the Nemean Games, the Isthmian Games were held both the year before and the year after the Olympic Games (the second and fourth years of an Olympiad), while the Pythian Games were held in the third year of the Olympiad cycle.

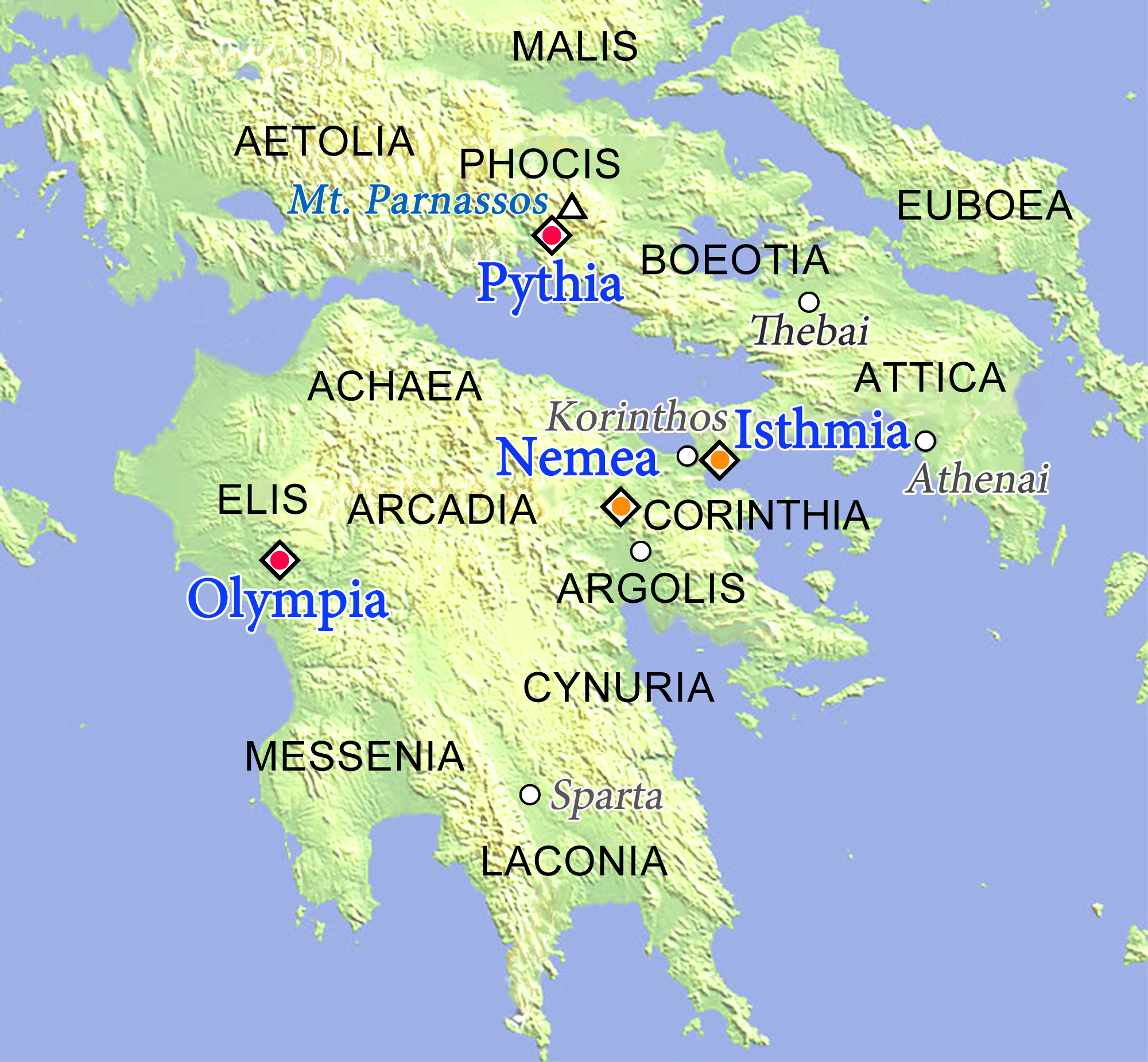
Four Panhellenic games.

== Origin ==
The Games were reputed to have originated as funeral games for Melicertes (also known as Palaemon), instituted by Sisyphus, legendary founder and king of Corinth, who discovered the dead body and buried it subsequently on the Isthmus. In Roman times, Melicertes was worshipped in the region. Another likely later myth held that Theseus, legendary king of Athens, expanded Melicertes' funeral games from a closed nightly rite into fully-fledged athletic-games event which was dedicated to Poseidon, open to all Greeks, and was at a suitable level of advancement and popularity to rival those in Olympia, which were founded by Heracles. Theseus arranged with the Corinthians for any Athenian visitors to the Isthmian games to be granted the privilege of front seats (prohedria, Ancient Greek προεδρία). Another version states that Kypselos, tyrant of Corinth in the 7th century BC, returned to the Games their old splendour.

== Organization ==
According to Solinus, the Isthmian Games were constituted in the 49th Olympiad. The 49th Olympiad began in 584 BC. The Olympic Games took place in July/August; the Isthmian Games in April/May of the second year of the Olympiad. Therefore, the date 582 BC is accepted by historically-derived documents, for instance, Der neue Pauly (under Isthmia). However, Holt and Curta (2016) instead place the first Isthmian Games in 581 BC.

The festival included athletic and musical competitions to honor the god Poseidon, and was held in the spring of the second and fourth years of each Olympiad at Poseidon's rural sanctuary on the Isthmus of Corinth, the small neck of land that connects the Peloponnesian peninsula with Central Greece. Since it was easy to reach both from land and sea, the Isthmia was a natural meeting place.

This festival was open to all Greeks and the Isthmian games were especially popular with Athenians, though the Eleans boycotted them. The Isthmian games were used by many as a forum for political propaganda.

These were stephanitic games (i.e., with a crown as prize) and at least until the 5th century BC (Pindar's time) the winners of the Isthmian games received a wreath of celery; later, the wreath was altered such that it consisted of pine leaves and called Isthmian pine (Ἰσθμικὴ πίτυς). Victors could also be honored with a statue or an ode. Besides these prizes of honor, the city of Athens awarded victorious Athenians with 100 drachmas.

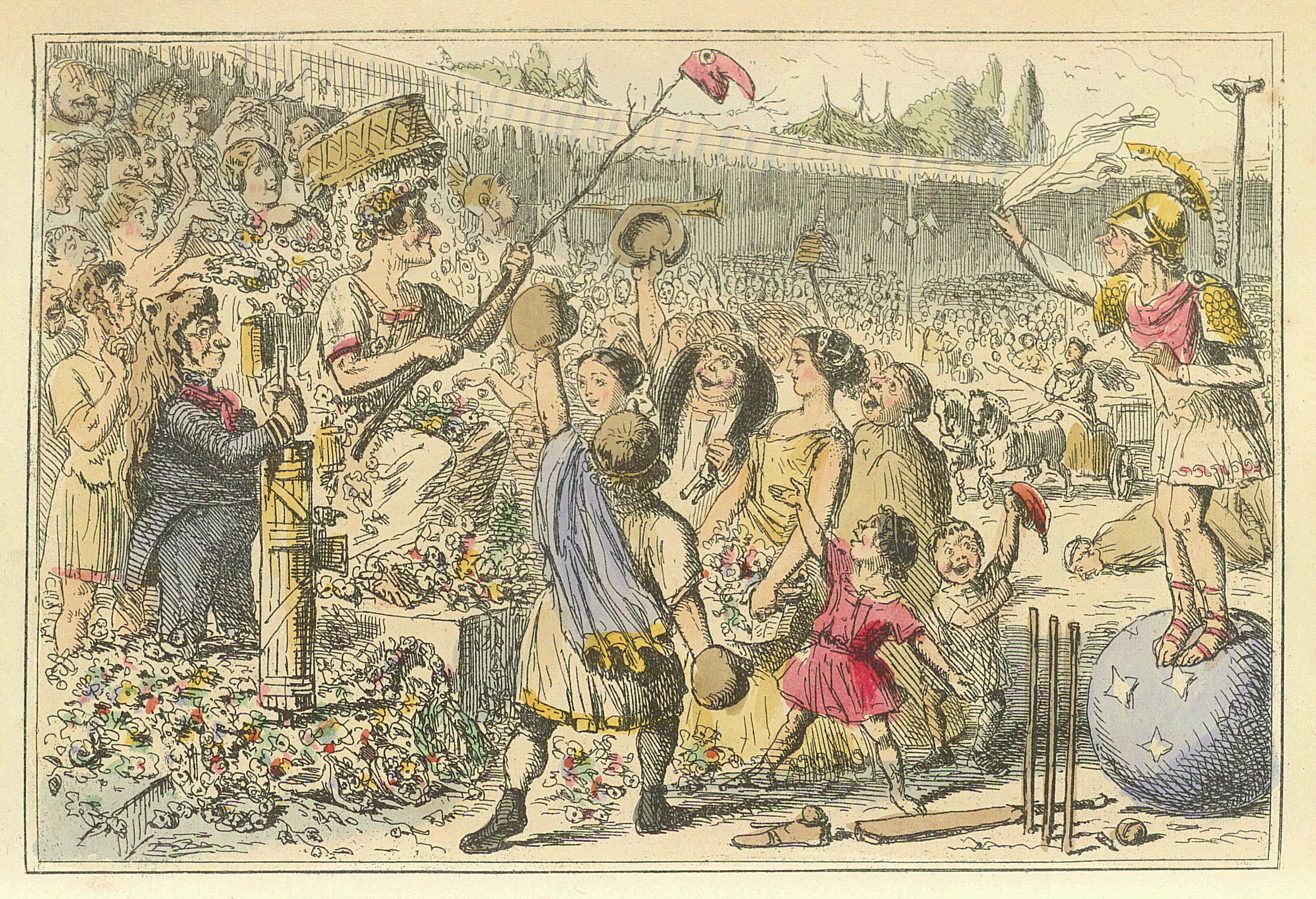
Flamininus restoring Liberty to Greece at the Isthmian Games.

From 228 BC or 229 BC onwards the Romans were allowed to take part in the games. In 196 BC Titus Quinctius Flamininus used the occasion of the games to proclaim the freedom of the Greek states from Macedonian hegemony. According to Appian's account:

When he had arranged these things with them he went to the Isthmian games, and, the stadium being full of people, he commanded silence by trumpet and directed the herald to make this proclamation, "The Roman people and Senate, and Flamininus, their general, having vanquished the Macedonians and Philip, their king, order that Greece shall be free from foreign garrisons, not subject to tribute, and shall live under her own customs and laws." Thereupon there was great shouting and rejoicing and a scene of rapturous tumult; and groups here and there called the herald back in order that he might repeat his words for them. They threw crowns and fillets upon the general and voted statues for him in their cities. They sent ambassadors with golden crowns to the Capitol at Rome to express their gratitude, and inscribed themselves as allies of the Roman people. Such was the end of the second war between the Romans and Philip.

Since the games' inception, Corinth had always been in control of them. When Corinth was destroyed by the Romans in 146 BC, the Isthmian games continued, but were now administered by Sicyon. Corinth was rebuilt by Caesar in 44 BC, and recovered ownership of the Games shortly thereafter, but they were then held in Corinth. They did not return to the Isthmus until AD 42 or 43. Libanius mentions the continuation of cultic activities at the Isthmus into the middle of the 4th century, and the games probably continued at least until the end of that century. The circumstances of their demise are unknown. Imperial pressure against pagan rituals was heightened at the end of the 4th century, but some polytheistic cult practices certainly continued at Corinth into the 6th century.

== Contests ==
The games were the same as those in Olympia including wrestling, pancration, and horse racing. Among other competitions were:

- Chariot races, men only
- Pankration, men only
- Wrestling, men only
- Musical and poetical contests, in which women were allowed to compete.
- Boxing, men only.

The commentator Papagalos also records the first instance of οισοληνειν (oisoleven), an early form of snooker played with painted pottery balls

== Famous victors ==
- Kleitomachos of Thebes won wrestling, boxing and pankration on the same day.
- Plato is said to have competed at the games in wrestling.

== Isthmian truce ==
Before the Games began, a truce was declared by Corinth to grant athletes safe passage through Greece. In 412 BC, even though Athens and Corinth were at war, the Athenians were invited to the games as usual.

== See also ==
- The Temple of Poseidon at Isthmia
- Category:Ancient Isthmian athletes
