= Silver Bull of Delphi =

Silver statue found in Delphi

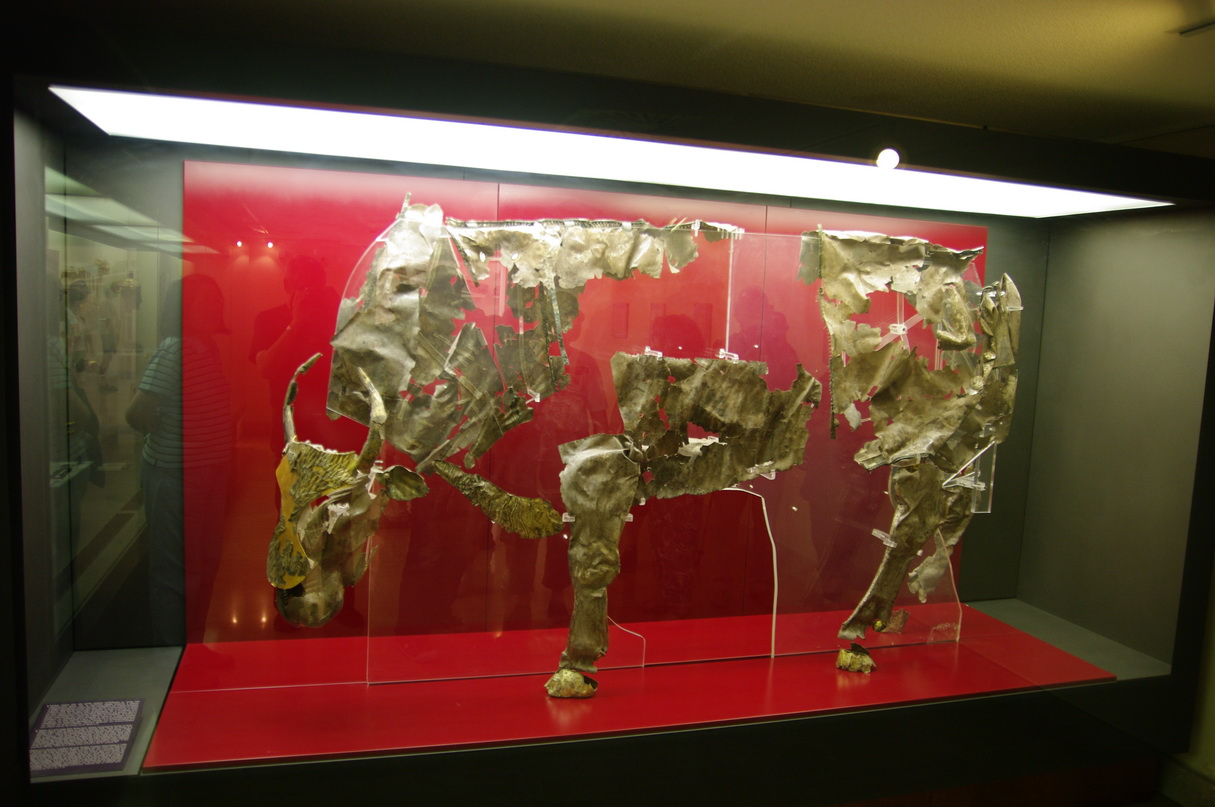
The bull in the Archaeological Museum of Delphi.

The silver bull of Delphi is the first known large-scale statue all made from forged metal – a bull made of sheets of silver and plated gold detail.

== Description ==
The sixty silver leaves that were found crumbled and damaged in a depository of the Delphic Sanctuary, after long and detailed conservation work, managed to revive, even if only in our imagination, the silver bull statue. The shape of the statue was created by a wooden core, which was filled with some malleable material: clay, wax or plaster. The silver leaves were applied on top of it and were secured with nails. The details of the bull (horns, ears, hooves etc) were gold-plated.

== Current form ==
It is apparent that the current form of the bull is unable to deliver its volume and plasticity of the past. The interior of the core was lost and its dimensions were altered, since its initial total length seems to have reached about 2.5 meters. It was, however, a valuable Ionic offering that dates back to around the 6th century B.C.
