= Outline of classical architecture =

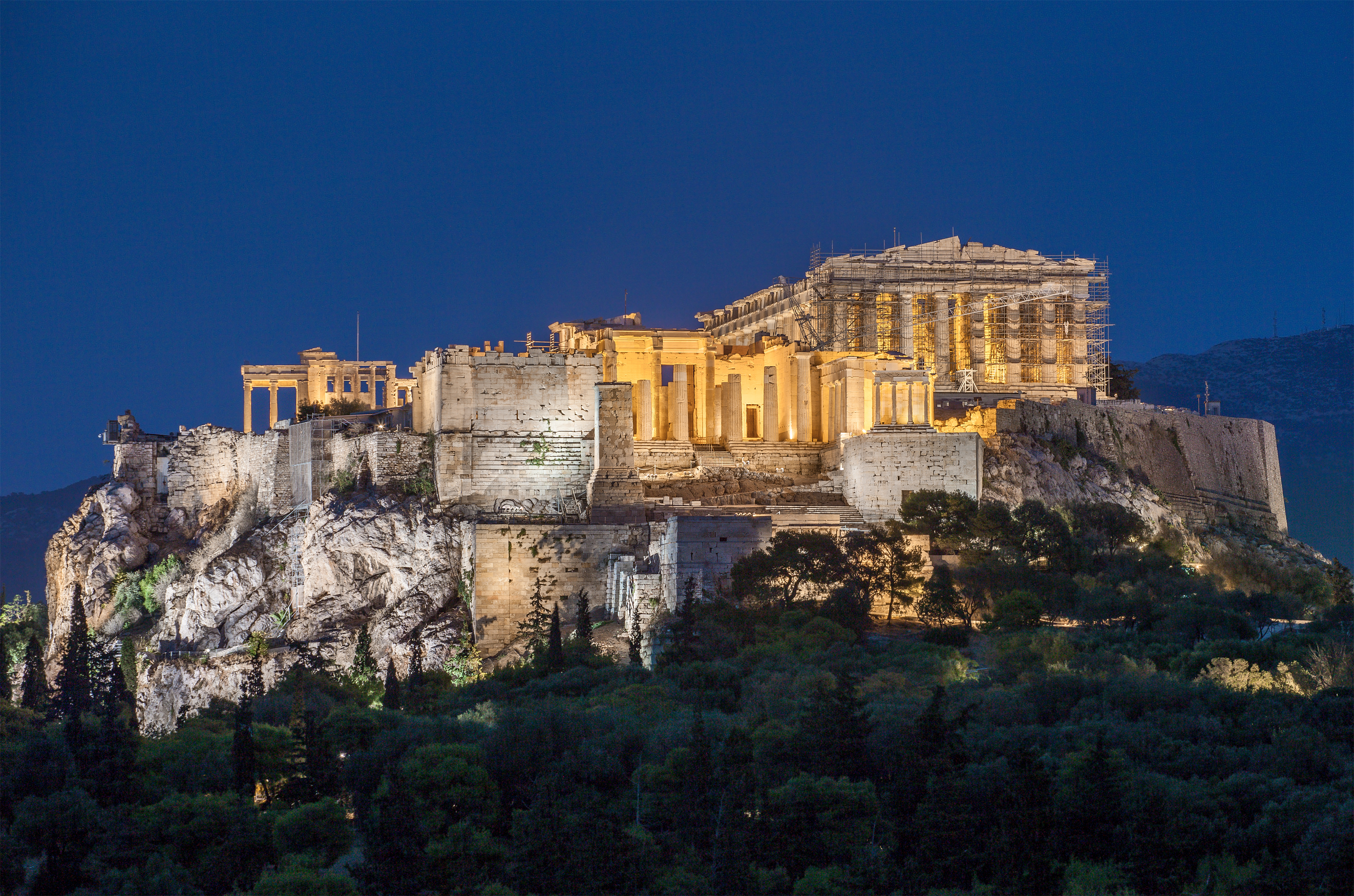
The Acropolis of Athens, a World Heritage Site in Athens, Greece

The following outline is provided as an overview of and topical guide to classical architecture:

Classical architecture typically refers to architecture consciously derived from the principles of Greek and Roman architecture of classical antiquity, or more specifically, from De architectura (c. 10 AD) by the Roman architect Vitruvius. Variations of classical architecture have arguably existed since the Carolingian Renaissance, and became especially prominent during the Italian Renaissance and the later period known as neoclassical architecture or Classical revival. While classical styles of architecture can vary, they generally share a common "vocabulary" of decorative and structural elements. Across much of the Western world, classical architectural styles have dominated the history of architecture from the Renaissance until World War II. Classical architecture continues to influence contemporary architects.

== What type of thing is classical architecture? ==
Classical architecture can be described as all of the following:

- Architecture – both the process and product of planning, designing and construction. Architectural works, in the material form of buildings, are often perceived as cultural and political symbols and as works of art. Historical civilizations are often identified with their surviving architectural achievements.
  - Architectural style – classification of architecture in terms of the use of form, techniques, materials, time period, region and other stylistic influences.
- Art – aesthetic expression for presentation or performance, and the work produced from this activity. The word "art" is therefore both a verb and a noun, as is the term "classical architecture".
  - One of the arts – as an art form, classical architecture is an outlet of human expression, that is usually influenced by culture and which in turn helps to change culture. Classical architecture is a physical manifestation of the internal human creative impulse.
    - A branch of the visual arts – visual arts is a class of art forms, including painting, sculpture, photography, architecture and others, that focus on the creation of works which are primarily visual in nature.
- Form of classicism – high regard in the arts for classical antiquity, as setting standards for taste which the classicists seek to emulate.
  - Classicism in architecture – places emphasis on symmetry, proportion, geometry and the regularity of parts as they are demonstrated in the architecture of Classical antiquity and in particular, the architecture of Ancient Rome, of which many examples remained.

== Classical architectural structures ==
=== Ancient Greek architectural structures ===
Ancient Greek architecture – architecture produced by the Greek-speaking people (Hellenic people) whose culture flourished on the Greek mainland and Peloponnesus, the Aegean Islands, and in colonies in Asia Minor and Italy for a period from about 900 BC until the 1st century AD, with the earliest remaining architectural works dating from around 600 BC. Ancient Greek architecture is best known from its temples, and the Parthenon is a prime example.

- Acropolis
  - Acropolis of Athens
- Agora
  - Ancient Agora of Athens
- Ancient Greek temple – List of Ancient Greek temples
  - Adyton
  - Cella
  - Opisthodomos
  - Peristasis
  - Pronaos
  - Pteron

Types of temple
- Amphiprostyle
- Antae temple
- Metroon
- Naiskos
- Peripteros
- Pseudodipteral
- Pseudoperipteros

- Ancient Greek theatre – List of ancient Greek theatres
  - Parodos
  - Skene
- Bouleuterion
- Greek baths
- Greek gardens
- Gymnasium
  - Conisterium
  - Xystus
- Heroön
- Hippodrome
- Mausoleum
- Monopteros
- Neorion
- Palaestra
- Peribolos
- Propylaea
- Prostyle
- Prytaneion
- Pteron
- Rostral column
- Stadium
- Stoa – List of stoae
- Tholos

=== Ancient Roman architectural structures ===
Ancient Roman architecture – the Roman architectural revolution, also known as the concrete revolution, was the widespread use in Roman architecture of the previously little-used architectural forms of the arch, vault, and dome. A crucial factor in this development that saw a trend to monumental architecture was the invention of Roman concrete (also called opus caementicium).

- Public architecture
  - Amphitheatre – List of Roman amphitheatres
  - Aqueduct – List of aqueducts in the city of Rome, List of aqueducts in the Roman Empire, and List of Roman aqueducts by date
  - Basilica
  - Bridge – List of Roman bridges
  - Canal – List of Roman canals
  - Castellum
  - Circus – List of Roman circuses
  - Cistern – List of Roman cisterns
  - Dams and reservoirs – List of Roman dams and reservoirs
  - Defensive wall
  - Dome – List of Roman domes
  - Forum
  - Hippodrome
  - Horreum
  - Hypaethral
  - Insula
  - Monument – List of ancient monuments in Rome, List of monuments of the Roman Forum
  - Nymphaeum
  - Obelisk – List of obelisks in Rome
  - Odeon
  - Roman lighthouse
  - Roman watermill
  - Rostra
  - Temple – List of Ancient Roman temples
    - Antae temple
    - Mithraeum
  - Tetrapylon
  - Theatre – List of Roman theatres
    - Cavea
    - Scaenae frons
  - Thermae – List of Roman public baths
    - Sphaeristerium
  - Tholos
  - Triumphal arch – List of Roman triumphal arches
  - Victory column
    - Rostral column
- Private architecture
  - Domus
    - Atrium
    - Cavaedium
    - Coenaculum
    - Cubiculum
    - Exedra
    - Fauces
    - Impluvium
    - Oecus
    - Peristylium
    - Taberna
    - Tablinum
    - Triclinium
    - Vestibulum
  - Roman gardens
  - Villa
    - Villa rustica

== Architectural styles ==
Architectural style

- Byzantine architecture – initially, the early Byzantine architecture was stylistically and structurally indistinguishable from earlier Roman architecture; the ancient ways of building lived on, but relatively soon the architecture developed into a distinct Byzantine style.
- Pre-Romanesque architecture –
- Romanesque architecture – Romanesque architecture is the first pan-European architectural style since Imperial Roman architecture. Combining features of ancient Roman and Byzantine buildings and other local traditions, Romanesque architecture is known by its massive quality.
- Gothic architecture – Gothic architecture (with which classical architecture is often posed), can incorporate classical elements and details, but does not to the same degree reflect a conscious effort to draw upon the architectural traditions of antiquity.
- Renaissance architecture – is a conscious revival and development of certain elements of ancient Greek and Roman architecture. The Renaissance style places emphasis on symmetry, proportion, geometry and the regularity of parts, as they are demonstrated in the architecture of classical antiquity and in particular ancient Roman architecture, of which many examples remained. The classical architecture of the Renaissance from the outset represents a highly specific interpretation of the classical ideas.
- Palladian architecture – European style of architecture derived from the designs of the Italian Renaissance architect Andrea Palladio (1508–1580). Palladio's work was strongly based on the symmetry, perspective and values of the formal classical temple architecture of the Ancient Greeks and Romans.
- Baroque architecture – Baroque and Rococo architecture are styles which, although classical at root, display an architectural language very much in their own right. Baroque architects took the basic elements of Renaissance architecture and made them higher, grander, more decorated, and more dramatic.
- Georgian architecture – set of architectural styles current between 1720 and 1840. In the mainstream of Georgian style were both Palladian architecture— and its whimsical alternatives, Gothic and Chinoiserie, which were the English-speaking world's equivalent of European Rococo.
- Neoclassical architecture – architectural style produced by the neoclassical movement that began in the mid-18th century, manifested both in its details as a reaction against the Rococo style of naturalistic ornament, and in its architectural formulas as an outgrowth of some classicizing features of Late Baroque. In its purest form it is a style principally derived from the architecture of Classical Greece and the architecture of the Italian architect Andrea Palladio.
  - Empire style – sometimes considered the second phase of Neoclassicism, is an early-19th-century design movement in architecture, furniture, other decorative arts, and the visual arts followed in Europe and America until around 1830, although in the U. S. it continued in popularity in conservative regions outside the major metropolitan centers well past the mid-19th century.
  - Biedermeier architecture – neoclassical architecture in Central Europe between 1815 and 1848.
  - Resort architecture (Bäderarchitektur) – a specific neoclassical style that came up at the end of the 18th century in German seaside resorts and is widely used in the region until today.
  - Federal architecture – classicizing architecture built in the United States between c. 1780 and 1830, and particularly from 1785 to 1815. This style shares its name with its era, the Federal Period.
  - Regency architecture – buildings built in Britain during the period in the early 19th century when George IV was Prince Regent, and also to later buildings following the same style. The style corresponds to the Biedermeier style in the German-speaking lands, Federal style in the United States and to the French Empire style.
  - Greek Revival architecture – architectural movement of the late 18th and early 19th centuries, predominantly in Northern Europe and the United States. A product of Hellenism, it may be looked upon as the last phase in the development of Neoclassical architecture.
  - Beaux-Arts architecture –
- Nordic Classicism – style of architecture that briefly blossomed in the Nordic countries (Sweden, Denmark, Norway and Finland) between 1910 and 1930.
- New Classical Architecture – architectural movement to revive and embrace classical architecture as a legitimate form of architecture for the 20th and 21st centuries. Beginning first with Postmodern architecture's criticism of modernist architectural movements like International Style, New Classical architecture seeks to be an alternative to the ongoing dominance of Modern architecture.

== Architectural elements ==
=== Building elements ===
- Acroterion – ornament mounted at the apex of the pediment of a building
- Aedicula – small inset shrine
- Aegis
- Amphiprostyle
- Anathyrosis
- Anta
- Antefix
- Apollarium
- Apse
- Arch
- Architrave
- Archivolt
- Arris
- Atlas – male figure support
- Bracket
- Bucranium
- Capital
- Caryatid – female figure support
- Cippus
- Coffer
- Colonnade – long sequence of columns, joined by their entablature
- Column
- Corbel
- Cornerstone
- Cornice
- Crepidoma
- Crocket
- Cryptoporticus
- Cupola
- Decastyle
- Diaulos
- Diocletian (thermal) window
- Dome – List of Roman domes
- Eisodos
- Entablature – superstructure resting on the column capitals
- Epistyle – see Architrave
- Euthynteria
- Finial
- Frieze
- Geison
- Gutta
- Hypocaust
- Hypostyle
- Hypotrachelium
- Imbrex and tegula – interlocking roof tiles used in ancient Greek and Roman architecture
- Intercolumniation
- Keystone
- Metope
- Modillion
- Mosaic
- Oculus
- Ornament
- Orthostates
- Pediment
- Peristyle
- Pilae stacks
- Pilaster – flat surface raised from the wall to resemble a column
- Plinth
- Portico
  - Portico types: tetrastyle, hexastyle, octastyle, decastyle
- Post and lintel
- Pronaos
- Prostyle
- Puteal
- Quoin – masonry blocks in a wall's corner
- Roof – List of Greco-Roman roofs
- Rustication
- Scamilli impares
- Semi-dome
- Sima
- Sphinx
- Spiral stairs – List of ancient spiral stairs
- Spur
- Stoa – covered walkway or portico
- Stylobate
- Suspensura
- Tambour
- Term
- Triglyph
- Tympanum
- Taenia
- Velarium
- Vitruvian opening
- Volute
- Vomitorium

=== Building materials ===
- Aggregate
- Ceramic
- Lime mortar
- Marble
- Roman brick
- Roman concrete
- Spolia
- Terracotta

=== Classical orders ===
Classical orders

- Aeolic order – an early order of Classical architecture

Greek orders

- Doric order
- Ionic order
- Corinthian order

Roman orders

- Composite order
- Tuscan order

=== Types of buildings and structures ===
- Amphitheatre
- Bathhouse
  - Greek
  - Roman
- Bouleuterion
- Nymphaeum
- Odeon
- Stoa
- Temple
  - Greek
  - Roman
- Theater
  - Greek
  - Roman
- Tholos
- Treasury
- Villa
- Watermill – List of ancient watermills

== Classical architecture organizations ==
- The Institute of Classical Architecture and Art

== Classical architecture publications ==
- De architectura – treatise on architecture written by the Roman architect Vitruvius and dedicated to his patron, the emperor Caesar Augustus, as a guide for building projects. The work is one of the most important sources of modern knowledge of Roman building methods, planning, and design.
- De re aedificatoria – classic architectural treatise written by Leon Battista Alberti between 1443 and 1452. Although largely dependent on Vitruvius' De architectura, it was the first theoretical book on the subject written in the Italian Renaissance and in 1485 became the first printed book on architecture.
- The Five Orders of Architecture (1562) by Giacomo Barozzi da Vignola.
- I quattro libri dell'architettura (1570) – a treatise on architecture by the architect Andrea Palladio.
- The Classical Language of Architecture, a 1965 compilation of six BBC radio lectures given in 1963 by Sir John Summerson.

== Persons influential in classical architecture ==
- John Summerson – one of the leading British architectural historians of the 20th century.
- John Travlos – Greek architectural historian, author.

== See also ==
- Architectural glossary
- Index of architecture articles
- Table of years in architecture
- Timeline of architecture
