= Palace of the Dux Ripae =

Coordinates: 34°45′05″N 40°43′46″E

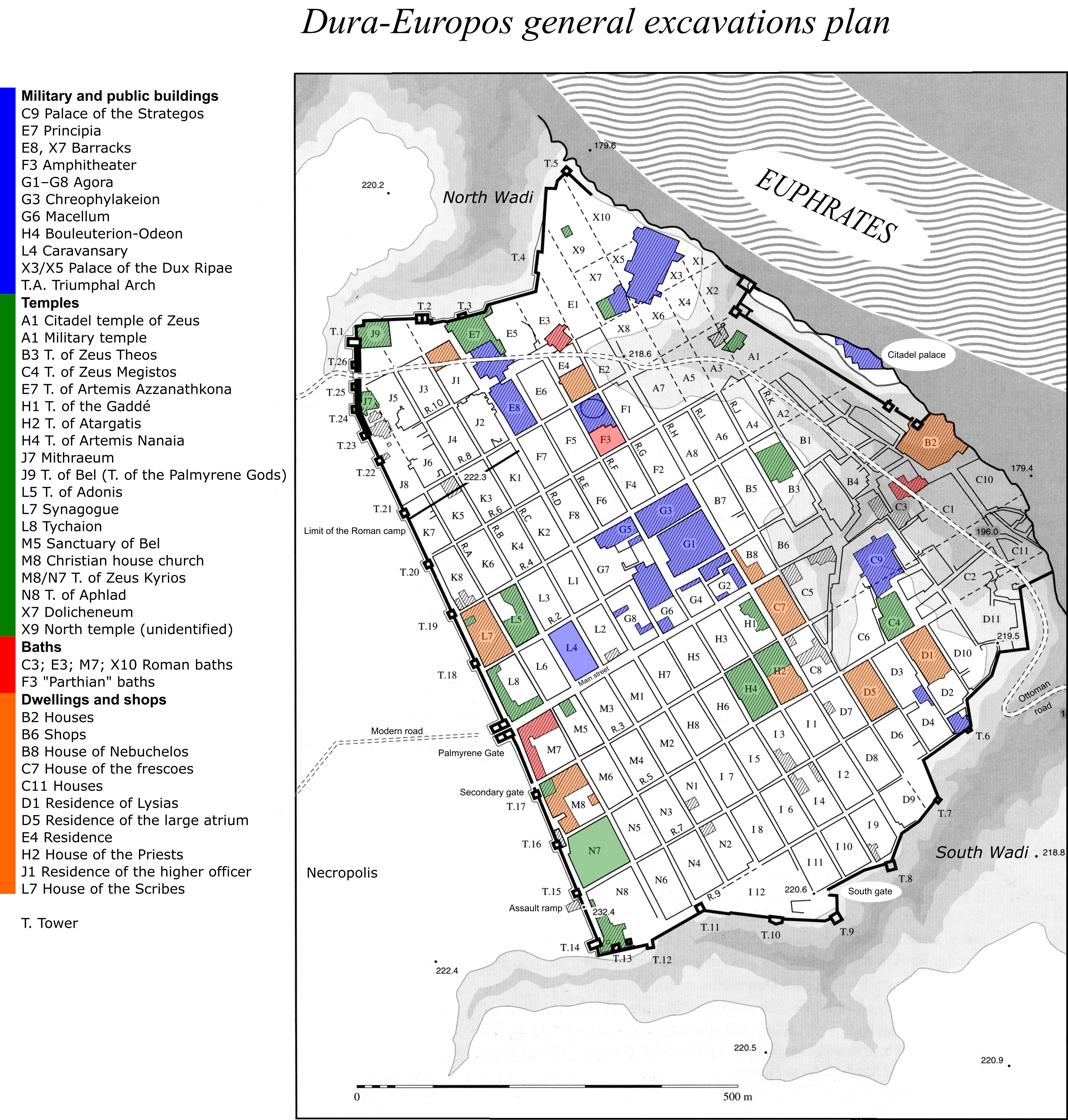
Dura-Europos general excavations plan, Palace of the Dux Ripae is marked as X3/X5

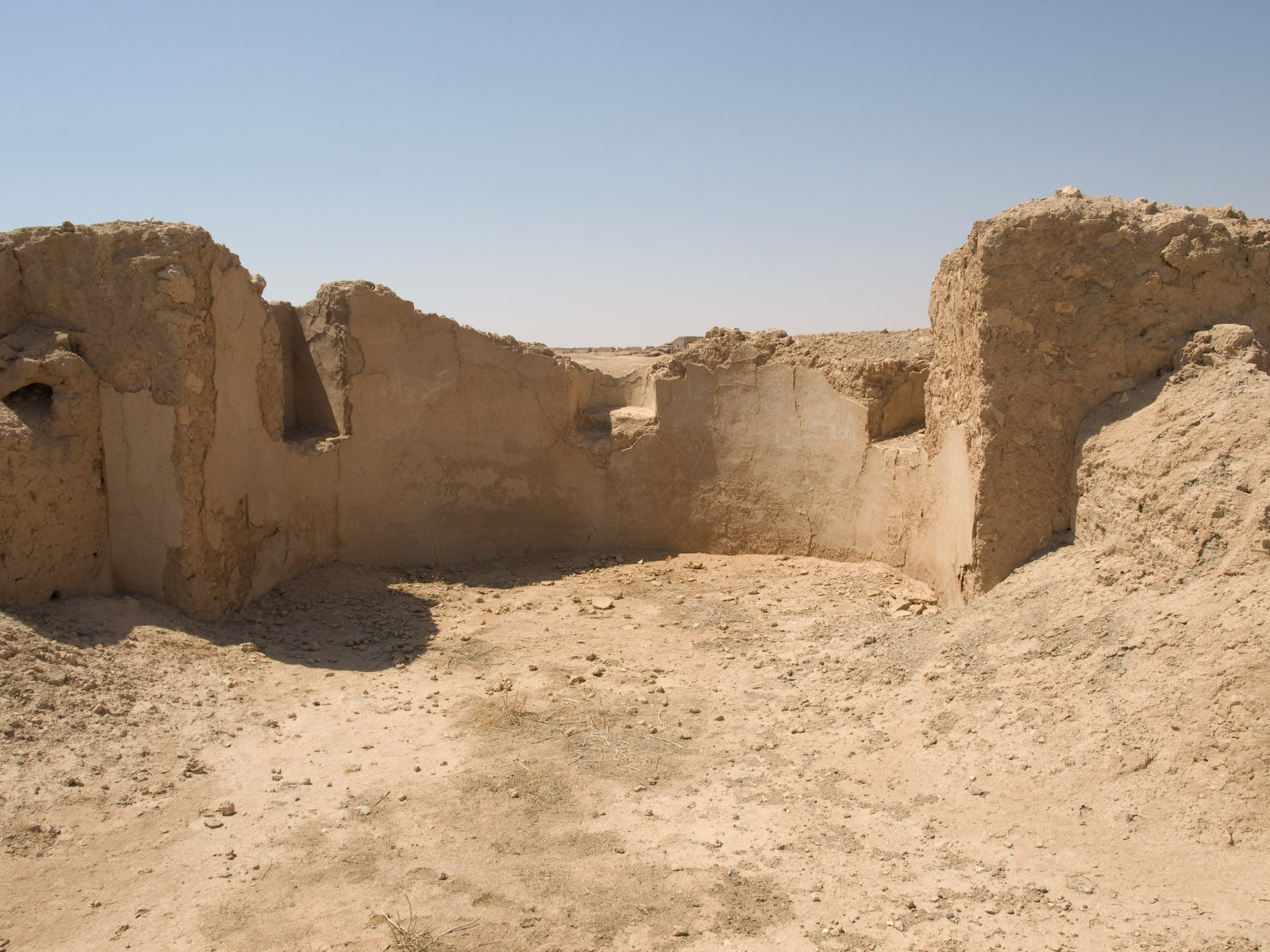
Apse in the Palace

The Palace of the Dux Ripae was the largest and most important building in Dura-Europos during the period of Roman rule. According to the inscriptions, the Palace was erected under Elagabalus (AD 218–222) and it seems to have survived until the Sassanid conquest of Dura-Europos in AD 256.

== Description ==
The palace was about 87.5 m long and 62.5 m wide. The building was located in the northeast of the city, on a high point immediately overlooking the Euphrates river. The entrance was located in the south. It led into a large palaestra (30.78 m x 30.78 m) with ten columns on each side. There was an exedra here, from which judgements were delivered. Ceremonial events and diplomatic receptions probably also took place in this courtyard.

A door led from the first courtyard to a large peristyle (25.16 m x 22.71 m). Nearly all the other rooms of the palace were arranged around this peristyle. On the river side of the palace there was a terrace, with the private rooms arranged along it. There were three residential suites. The other rooms arranged around the peristyle were mostly single rooms, but in the west there was another group of rooms, which probably also served as a suite. The building also had its own bathhouse.

The Palace was made out of bricks. Many of the rooms had vaulted ceilings. The roof of the palace was completely flat. The walls and ceiling were plastered and some of them were painted. The paintings on the ceilings consisted of various coffer patterns, while the walls were panels and imitation marble.

On the walls there were many inscriptions and graffiti. Many of these refer to the dux ripae (Head of the River), Domitius Pompeianus, who clearly lived in the central and largest suite that opened onto the terrace. His subordinates probably lived in the other suites. The function of the other rooms around the courtyard is unclear, though some probably were used as stables. The building was thus the official residence of these high officials who oversaw the administration of the Syrian border and probably also the civic administration of Dura-Europos.

The palace confirms to the standard model of the Roman Villa rustica with reduced corner avant-corps and is thus typical of Roman architecture. Only the flat roof did not belong to a Roman tradition.

== Bibliography ==
- M. I. Rostovtzeff, A. R. Bellinger, F. E. Brown, C. B. Wells: The Excavations at Dura Europos. Preliminary Report of the Ninth Season of Work, 1935–1936. Part III. The Palace of the Dux Ripae and the Dolicheneum. New Haven, London 1952.
- Alexander G. McKay: Römische Häuser, Villen und Paläste. Luzern 1980, ISBN 3-7611-0585-1, S. 161–162.
