= Xystum =

In architecture, the term xystum refers to a wall, promenade, alley, or open path. It can also refer to an atrium, ambulacrum, or parvis in front of a basilica. The term should not be confused with the ancient Greek architectural term xystus, meaning the covered portico of a gymnasium.

== Sources ==
Curl, James Stevens (2006). A Dictionary of Architecture and Landscape Architecture (Paperback) (Second ed.). Oxford University Press. p. 880. ISBN 0-19-860678-8.
