= Diaulos =

Diaulos (Greek: Δίαυλος) may refer to:

- Diaulos (architecture)
- Diaulos (running race)
- Diaulos (instrument), sometimes (wrongly) used for the aulos
- Diaulos (mythology)
