= Gymnasium at Delphi =

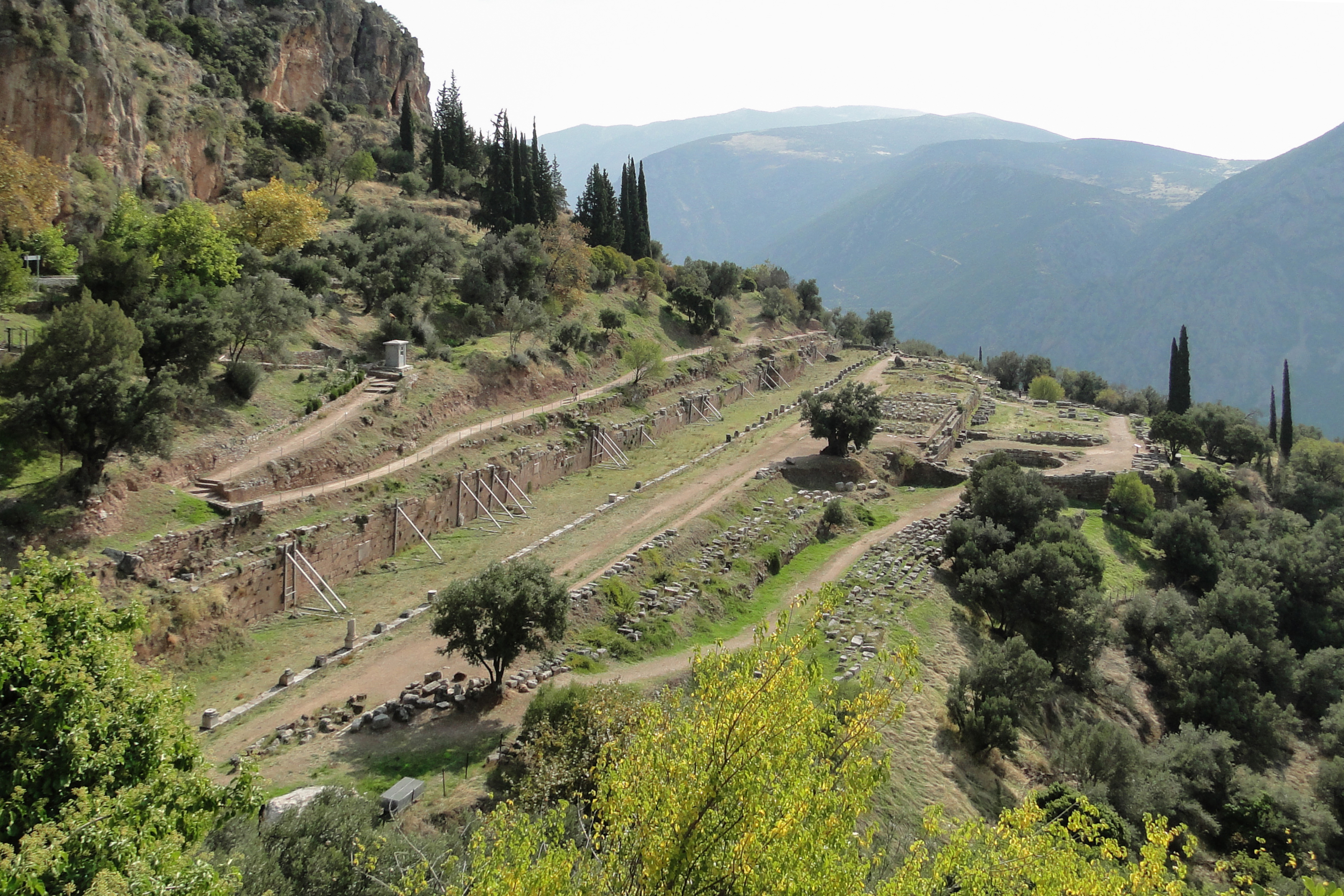
View of the Gymnasium at Delphi

The Gymnasium at Delphi is a building complex of the 4th century BC at Delphi, Greece, which comprised the xystus and the palaestra, along with its auxiliary buildings such as the changing rooms and baths. It was situated between the Sanctuary of Athena Pronaia and the Castalian Spring. Some remains of archaic buildings, discovered under the xystus, were possibly related to a sanctuary dedicated to Demeter and indicate the sanctity of the area from earlier times.

As of February 2024 The Gymnasium area is closed to visitors.

== Description ==
The Gymnasium of Delphi was situated between the Sanctuary of Athena Pronaia and the Castalian Spring. Until the beginning of the excavations at Delphi, the Gymnasium was covered by the monastery of the Dormition of Mary, known also as "Panagia". The wall-paintings of the monastery were detached before its demolition and are nowadays exhibited in the Byzantine and Christian Museum in Athens. The Gymnasium consisted of two main building complexes arrayed along two terraces. One comprised the xystus and the "paradromis", i.e. an auxiliary corridor used by the runners, and the other the palaestra with all its annexes, such as the changing rooms and the baths.

== The xystos ==
The xystos was a covered portico measuring about 186 by 9 metres (610 ft × 30 ft). It was initially formed by a Doric colonnade made of poros stone, dated to the 4th century and consisting of 83 columns. In the Roman period this colonnade was replaced by an Ionic one made of marble but with the same number of columns. The floor of the xystus was covered with sand for facilitating the athletes.

== The palaestra ==
On the lower terrace was situated the palaestra, comprising a square central court of the "impluvium" type, surrounded by porticoes divided in rooms. There were two entrances from the southeast and from the north. The inscriptions inform us on the usage of these rooms as pool room, changing rooms, fighting room and platform. To the west of the palaestra there is still visible today a round pool of a 10-metre-long (33 ft) diameter and a depth of 1.80 metres (5.9 ft). Castalia provided water to this basin which, in its turn, distributed water to ten stone bathing basins. In the Roman period a bath with hot water was built also close to the Gymnasium, thus offering an extra luxury to the athletes.

The Gymnasium was first built at around 330 B.C., whereas additions and restoration works took place in various phases throughout its history. Many of the travelers who visited Delphi throughout the Ottoman period used to stay at the monastery of Panagia and carved their names on some fallen columns of the Gymnasium which lay in situ; these signatures and marks, notably the one by Lord Byron, can be seen today on the restored columns.

== Bibliography ==
- Bommelaer, J.-F., Laroche, D., Guide de Delphes. Le site, Sites et Monuments 7, Paris 1991, 73-79. Bourguet, Ε., Les ruines de Delphes, Paris 1914, 294-302
- Daux, G., «A propos des gymnases de Delphes et de Délos», BCH 104, 1984, 134-146. Delorme, J., «Spairisterion et gymnase à Delphes, Délos et ailleurs», BCH 106, 1982, 53-73.
- Homolle, Th., «Le gymnase de Delphes», BCH 23, 1899, 560-583.
- Jannoray, J., Le « Gymnase du bas » à Delphes, BCH 61, 1937, 53-56.
- Jannoray, J., Le Gymnase, Fouilles de Delphes II.12., Paris 1953
