= Palaestra at Delphi =

Coordinates: 38°28′53″N 22°30′21″E

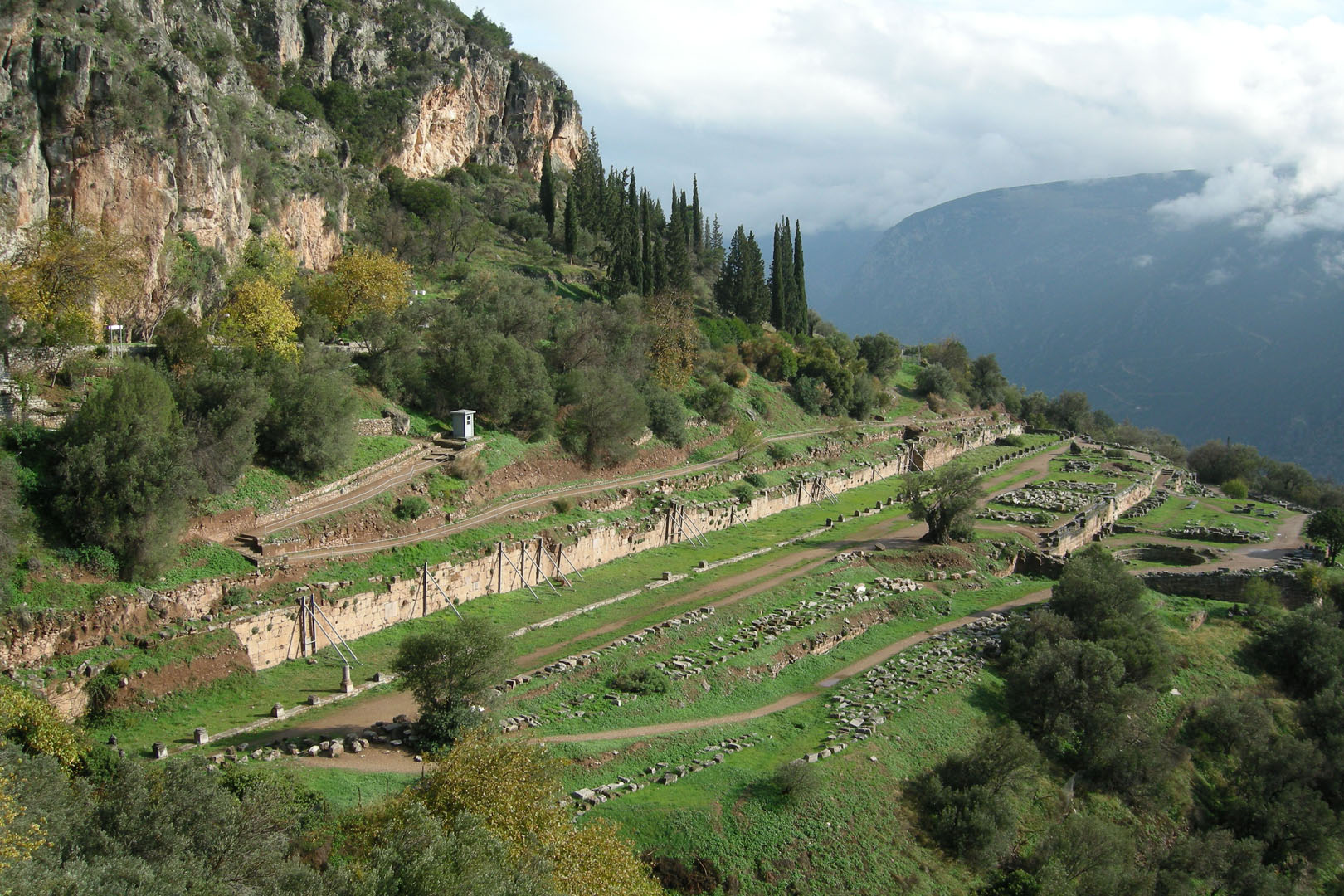
The ancient Gymnasium at Delphi

The palaestra at Delphi is part of a gymnasium at the sanctuary. It is the oldest existing gymnasium from the Greek world, dating to the second half of the fourth century B.C. It was built on two terraces, with the palaestra and baths on the lower terrace. The frequent earthquakes and landslides at Delphi have damaged the palaestra the most seriously of all of the gymnasium areas.

The palaestra is small, measuring thirty-two metres square. The central court is 14 metres square with an Ionic peristyle in blue limestone. The eastern wall of the palaestra is formed by the retaining wall for the terrace above. Several rooms open onto the north and west sides of the court. There are three rooms of identical dimensions (8 X 5.80 meters) along the north side of the palaestra. The middle of the three rooms was faced with two columns in antis and divided by a wall pierced with a door. Along the west side of the building there are also three rooms. The large room in the northwest corner measures 11 by 6.80 metres. Moving south, the two other rooms measure 7 by 10.70 and 11.50 by 10.70 meters, respectively.

For the most part, the uses of these rooms cannot be determined. Inscriptions have been found indicating that among these rooms were an apodyterion (undressing room) and two sphairisteria (ball play courts or rooms). The other rooms would certainly have included an elaiothesion (oiling room) and konisterion (dusting room), as dust (i.e. powder in the form of fine sand) and oil were essential parts of the athletic regime (the wrestlers anointed themselves with oil and sprinkled themselves with fine sand).

The palaestra itself did not include any bathing rooms because a bathing facility was built directly to the north along the same terrace. A corridor in the north side of the palaestra leads to the baths. The bathhouse or loutrón had eleven animal head spouts, through which water flowed from a nearby spring into ten basins and a large plunge bath 9.70 metres in diameter and 1.904 metres deep.

== See also ==
- Palaestra at Olympia
- Pankration

== Related links ==
- Perseus Digital Library, Delphi
- Aerial View of the Gymnasium at Delphi
