= Ottoman Delphi =

The Ottomans finalized their domination over Phocis and Delphi in ca. 1410. Delphi itself remained almost uninhabited for centuries. It seems that one of the first buildings of the early modern era was the monastery of the Dormition of Mary or of Panagia (the Mother of God) built above the ancient gymnasium. It must have been towards the end of the 15th or in the 16th century that a settlement started forming there, which eventually ended up forming the village of Kastri.

== Cyriacus of Ancona and his description ==
The first Westerner to have described the archaeological remains in Delphi and offered a rare view of the area for a period relatively unknown was Ciriaco de' Pizzicolli otherwise known as Cyriacus of Ancona. He was a remarkable personality, a genuine representative of Renaissance. He was originally a merchant, yet when he came across antiquities during his travels he became so impressed that he decided to learn ancient Greek and Latin at the age of 30, and then went on to a series of travels aiming at archaeological investigation and documentation, while undertaking various diplomatic missions, particularly to the Ottoman court. Cyriacus visited Delphi in March 1436 and remained there for six days. He recorded all the visible archaeological remains based on Pausanias for identification. He described the stadium and the theatre at that date as well as some free standing pieces of sculpture. He also recorded several inscriptions, most of which are now lost. His identifications however were not always correct: for example he described a round building he saw as the temple of Apollo while this was simply the base of the Argives' ex-voto.

Information for the following two centuries of Ottoman rule is relatively sparse and confused. Delphi was renamed Kastri and was subjected to the kaza (district) of Salona (Amphissa). We also know that the destructive earthquake of 1580 caused severe damage to the antiquities.

== The European travelers ==
Over the centuries the travelers from European countries increased and thus information on Delphi became more abundant. One of the roads which connected eastern and western Central Greece continued to pass from Delphi and thus many travelers coming from the West disembarked at Itea or Naupaktos and then took the long up the mountains passing from Delphi, usually on horseback.

From the mid-17th century onwards such visits became more frequent, as the fashion of traveling and collecting antiquities became so popular in Europe. Two renowned visitors of Delphi in those days were Sir George Wheler and Jacob Spon, who passed by in January 1676. The first building which attracted their attention was the monastery of Panagia built in “Marmaria”. It was an annex of the Monastery of Jerusalem situated in Davleia in Boeotia and stood there until its demolition during the Great Excavation at Delphi. In this monastery sojourned many of the travelers, who usually mention the good wine offered to them by the monks.

In 1766 came to Delphi a group of three men, namely the Oxford epigraphist Richard Chandler, the architect Nicholas Revett, and the painter William Pars, in the course of an expedition funded by the Society of Dilettanti, which promoted the study and collection of Greco-Roman antiquities. Their studies were published in 1769 under the title “Ionian Antiquities” followed by a collection of inscriptions as well as by two travelogues, one about Asia Minor (1775) and one about Greece (1776). Apart from the antiquities, they also related some vivid descriptions of daily life in Kastri, such as the crude behaviour of the Muslim Albanians who guarded the mountain passes.

In 1805 Edward Dodwell visited Delphi, accompanied by the painter Simone Pomardi. His descriptions and are the fine engravings by Pomardi, which decorated their book, published in 1819, constitute a valuable source on daily life in Kastri and Amphissa. For example, he describes a dinner at Chrisso or the hospitality offered to him and his companion by the priest of Kastri in a single-roomed house without ventilation for the escape of the smoke coming out of the hearth. The family used to live all together, without any sense of privacy.

A travelling destination such as Delphi naturally attracted the great Philhellene Lord Byron, who visited in 1809, accompanied by his friend John Cam Hobhouse. The poet was inspired by this visit to write -among other things- the following verses:

Yet there I've wandered by the vaulted rill;
Yes! Sighed o'er Delphi's long deserted shrine,
where, save that feeble fountain, all is still.

At the same time he noticed the signatures of other visitors on the ancient columns, in second use at the monastery of Panagia; among these was the signature of Lord Aberdeen (later Prime Minister), whom Byron accused, as he did with Lord Elgin, for the mutilation and stealing of antiquities. His disgust, however, did not prevent him from leaving his own signature on the marble of the same column, nowadays standing in the Gymnasium at Delphi.

== The first decades of the Greek state ==
After the foundation of the modern Greek state following the Greek War of Independence, the care for antiquities was a primary concern in the country. Several sculptures found in situ in Delphi were transported to the first museum founded by governor Capodistria in Aegina. However, there was a demand for creating a museum in Delphi itself. Plans for the excavation of the entire area existed since the 1860s, but the poverty of the Greek state made this impossible. Meanwhile, the foreign travelers continued to visit Delphi, among them the French poet and author Gustave Flaubert, who visited the site in 1851. The increasing numbers and influence of visitors possibly contributed to the final achievement of a deal between the French and Greek state, which ended up in the expropriation of the village Kastri, the relocation of the inhabitants and the implementation of the Great Excavation in Delphi.

== Bibliography ==
- Chandler, R, Revett, N., Pars, W., Ionian Antiquities, London 1769
- Chandler, R, Revett, N., Pars, W., Inscriptiones antiquae, pleraeque nondum editae, in Asia Minore et Graecia, praesertim Athensis, collectae, Oxford, 1774.
- Chandler, R, Revett, N., Pars, W., Travels in Asia Minor, Oxford, 1775.
- Chandler, R, Revett, N., Pars, W., Travels in Greece, Oxford, 1776.
- Constantine, D., Early Greek Travellers and the Hellenic Ideal, Cambridge 1984

Elliot, C.W.J., “Lord Byron, Early Travelers and the Monastery at Delphi”, AJA 1967, 283–291, πιν. 85-86

- Delphes cent ans après la Grande fouille. Essai de bilan. Actes du colloque organisé par l' EFA, 17-20 septembre 1992, BCH Suppl. 36, 2000, 7-21
- Wheler, George. A Journey into Greece... In Company of Dr Spon of Lyons. In six books. Containing I..., II..., III..., IV..., V..., VI..., London, William Cademan, Robert Kettlewell and Awnsham Churchill, 1682.
