= Conisterium =

Apartment in Greek and Roman gymnasiums

A conisterium (or conisterion) (Greek: κονιστἠριον) was an apartment in Greek and Roman gymnasiums. It was where sand or dust was stored, for use by wrestlers after they had been anointed with oil. They would either sprinkle it on themselves, or a slave would do it. The purpose of this was so that during a fight, the oil or sweat would not prevent a wrestler from having a good grip on his opponent. After a fight, or exercise, the powder was rubbed off with strigils, before the wrestler had a bath.

The conisterium was built after the coryceum and next to a cold bath called frigida lavatio. Conisteriums were also found in palaestras. In the palaestra of Vitruvius, for instance, the gymnasium chambers were built on the right side while the elaeothesium, tepidarium, and an unidentified chamber on the left.
