= Diaulos (architecture) =

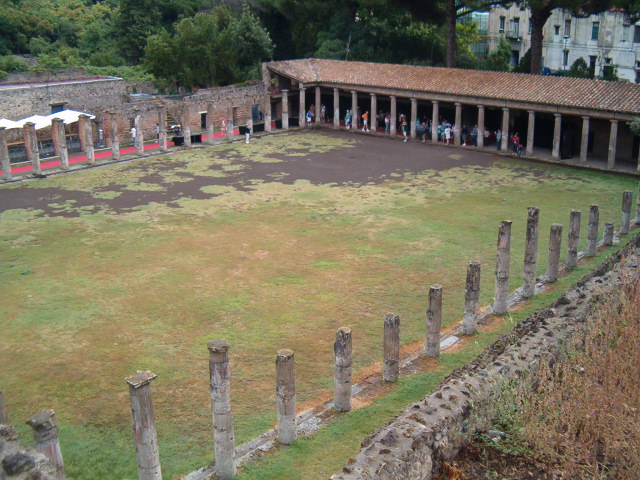
The palaestra at Pompeii

A diaulos (from Gr. δι-, "double", and αὐλός, "pipe"), in ancient Greek architecture, was a peristyle round the great court of the palaestra, described by Vitruvius, which measured two stadia (1,200 feet (370 m).) in length, on the south side this peristyle had two rows of columns, so that in stormy weather the rain might not be driven into the inner part. (Note: The word was also used in ancient Greece for a foot-race of twice the usual length.)

Vitruvius says that the diaulos should contain "spacious exedrae... with seats, so that philosophers, orators, and everyone else who delights in study will be able to sit and hold discussions." The double (south) portico should contain a large exedra, on one side a punching bag, a dust bath, and a cold water sink (loutron), on the other side an oiling room, a cold bath (frigidarium), and a passage to the stream room, sauna, and hot-water washing area.

The Gymnasium of the Theater at Ephesus was surrounded on three sides with a covered corridor, thirty feet wide (Diaulos), in the centre of which, at the back, were the various halls connected with the baths

== See also ==
- Glossary of architecture
- Palaestra at Delphi
- Palaestra at Olympia
