= Palaestra at Olympia =

Ancient Greek wrestling grounds

Coordinates: 37.6385°N 21.6286°E

- παλαίστρα ἐν Όλυμπία (Ancient Greek)
- Gymnasium at Olympia
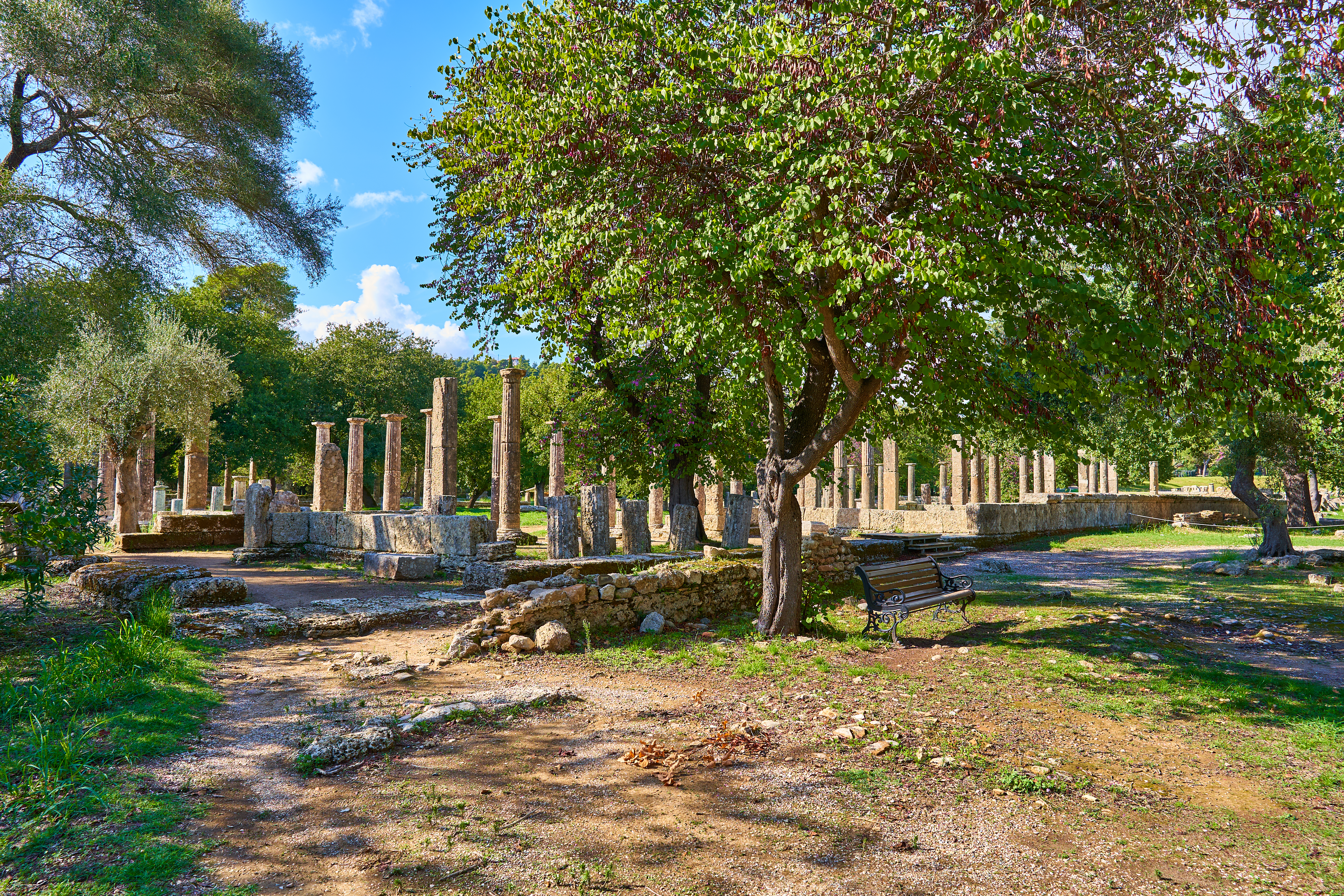
- From outside the southeast corner

- Type: peristyle building
- Satellite of: The gymnasion
- Location: Elis
- Region: Peloponnesus
- Part of: archaeological site of ancient Olympia

History
- Built: 3rd century BC
- Event(s): Training for wrestling, boxing, and the pankration

Site notes
- Material: Stone foundations, brick upper walls covered with mortar probably decorated, wooden entablature
- Elevation: 37 m (121 ft)
- Length: 66.35 m (217.7 ft)
- Width: 66.75 m (219.0 ft)
- Area: 4,428.86 m^{2} (1.09440 acres)
- Architectural styles: Mainly Doric porticos, but also Ionian and Corinthian for doorways
- Archaeologists: German Archaeological Institute at Athens
- Condition: Foundations, partial columns, some restored columns.
- Owner: Ministry of Culture and Sports (Greece)
- Public access: yes with ticket to the park

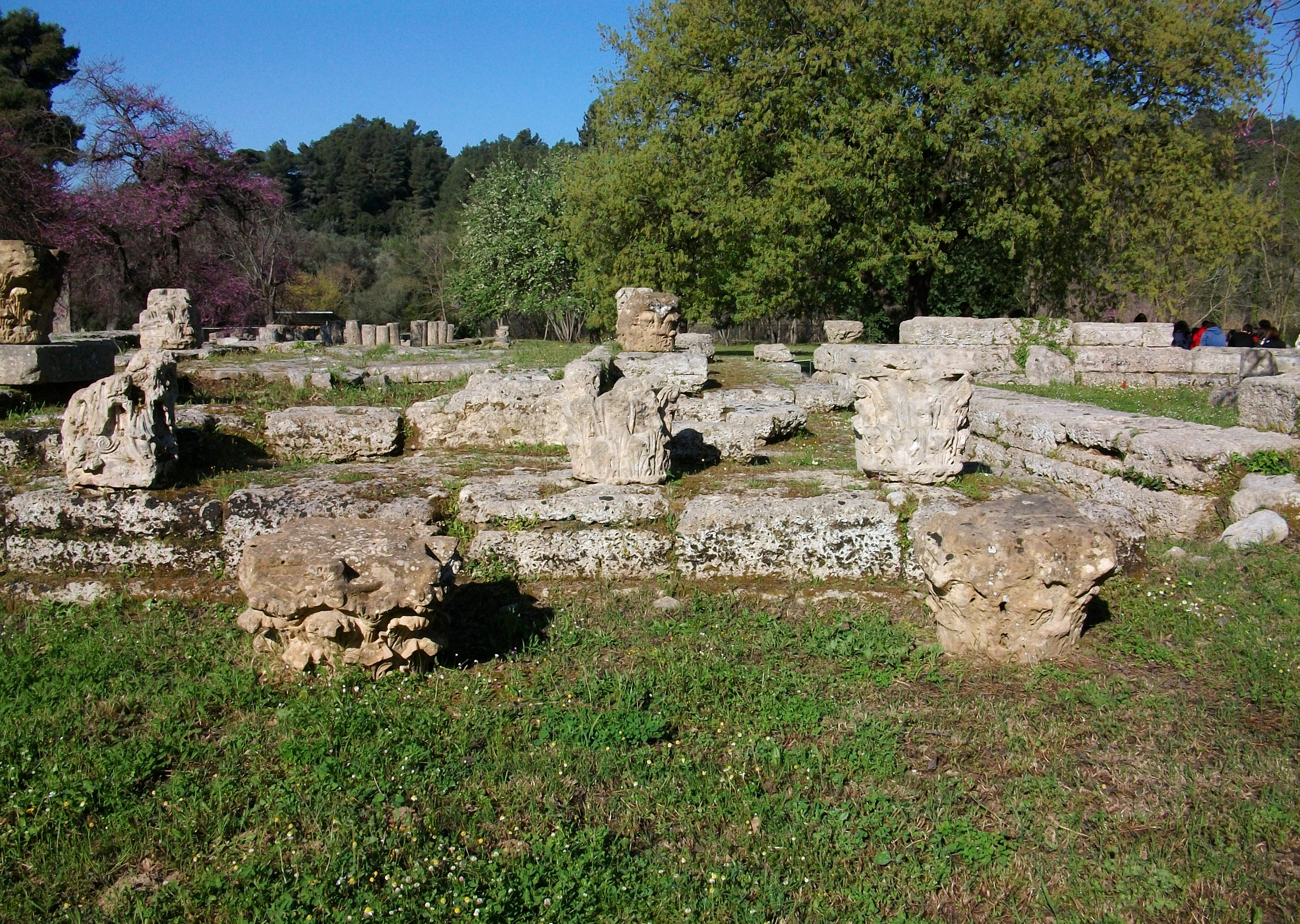
Grandiose (Corinthian) entrance building to the gymnasion, palaestra on left, dromoi on right.

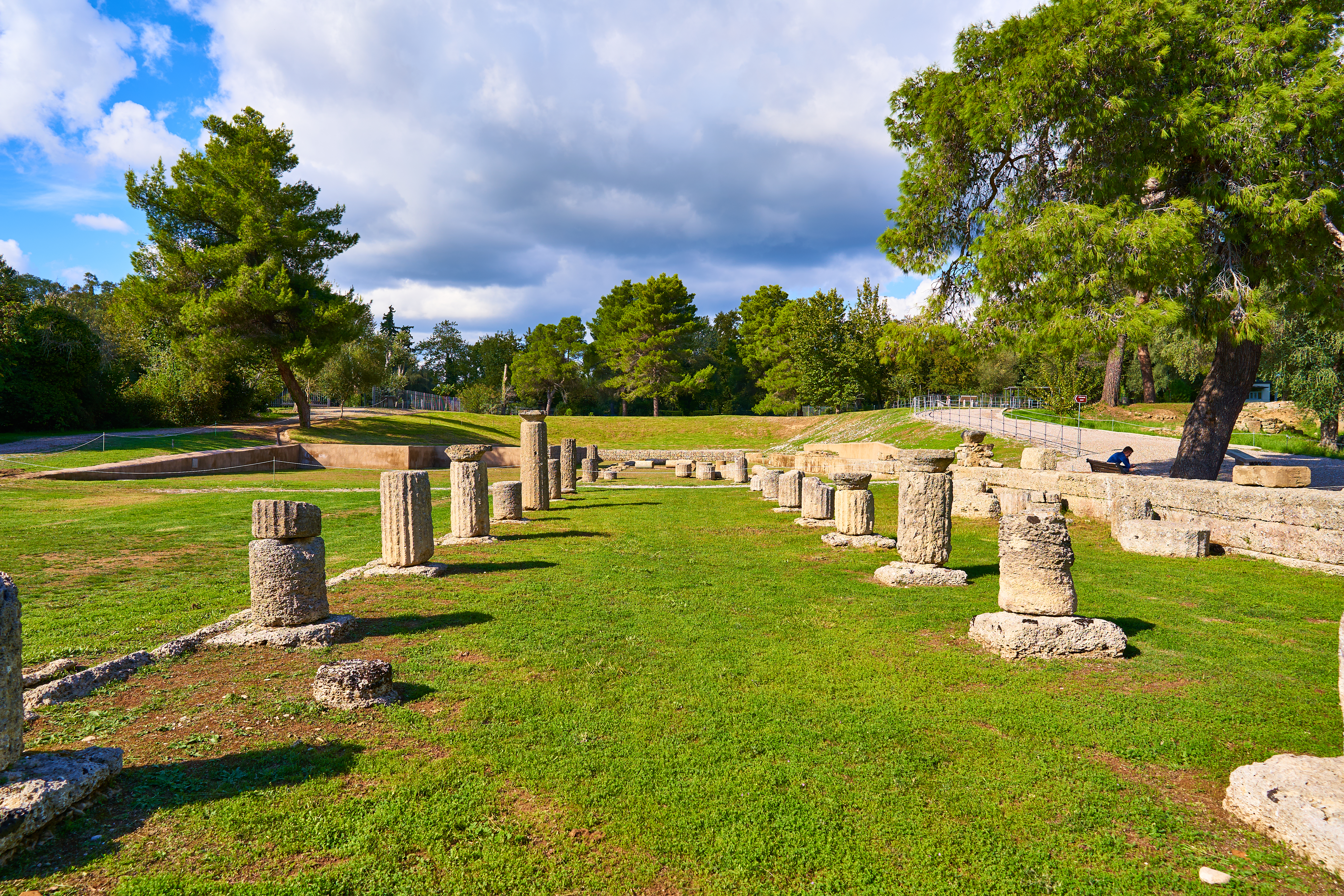
North end of dromoi in the gymnasion. The portico here is believed by some to have been a covered alternative to the uncovered running track for use when it rains. If not that then it shelters spectators or anyone: athletes or trainers, from the sun. North entrance to park seen on upper right. On the far left are modern walls delineating the excavation from private land.

The palaestra at Olympia (Greek παλαίστρ-α, -αι, "wrestling ground or grounds," Latin palaestr-a, -ae, with Greek ἐν Όλυμπία, Latin in Olympia) is the ground or grounds in ancient Olympia where πάλη, Doric πάλα, "wrestling," was taught and performed for training purposes; i.e., "wrestling-school." Two other martial arts were taught there: Greek πυγμή (pygme), Latin pugnus, "fist, boxing," and Greek παγκράτιον, Latin pancration or pancratium, "any method," which was free-style, or hand-to-hand, including grappling, kicking, punching, or any unarmed method whatever, no holds barred. The latter was sometimes deadly, or disfiguring (with permission), which indicates that the arts were ephebic, or "soldier" training for prospective citizens of the city-state sponsoring the school, such as Elis, but here combined with prospective candidacy for contention in the games. Be that as it may, none of the games were conducted without rules, umpires, and judges, who did not hesitate to stop contests, fine contenders with in some cases amounts prohibiting future participation, or bar flagrant violators.

The architecture of the martial arts school was standard in the Graeco-Roman world: a hollow square bordered all around by a peribolos ("border"), here a roofed portico, which in turn was bordered by rooms looking inward, and another border outside of it consisting of rooms facing outward, back-to-back with the inner rooms. The outer rooms possibly housed the resident population of athletes-in-training. The layout is standard military similar to that of a camp hospital, which placed patients in the outer rooms and grew medicinal herbs in the quadrangle.

== Location ==
The ultimate authority on the features of ancient Olympia is generally considered to be Pausanias, who lived and wrote under the "good emperors" in the 2nd century; that is, he was least subject to imperial ideological terror. His Description of Greek covers his first-hand observations recorded during his expeditionary travels, Olympia being described under Elis, Books 5 and 6. Two passages are especially relevant to the athletic training school:

The Town Hall (prytaneion) of the Eleans is within the Atlantis, and it has been destroyed beside the exit beyond the gymnasium. In this gymnasium are the running-tracks (dromoi) and the wrestling-grounds (palaistrai) for the athletes.
In the gymnasium at Olympia it is customary for pentathletes (pentathloi) and runners (dromeis) to practise, .... There is also another enclosure (peribolos), less than this, to the left of the entrance to the gymnasium, and the athletes have their wrestling-schools (palaistrai) here. Adjoining the wall of the eastern porch of the gymnasium are the dwellings (oikeiseis) of the athletes, turned towards the southwest.

These passages made it possible for the archaeologists to connect the descriptions of Pausanias to edifices and areas of the excavated site. (Note: The building was one of the first uncovered in 1876. By 1892, the publication by Friedrich Adler, Richard Borrmann, and Wilhelm Dörpfeld of Die Baudenkmäler von Olympia identifies the building, tying it to Pausanias 6.21.2. Emme 2018, p. 144) The "exit beyond the gymnasium" has to be either the north exit, leading to the town, or the south exit, leading (at that time) across the Alfeios River. The gymnasion contains dromoi, but the main running course, the stadium, is not near either exit or any building that could be construed to have been a prytaneum. The only other dromoi found are in item 20, near the north exit. The prytaneum then falls into place as item 2.

Pausanias says that the gymnasion included both the dromoi and the palaistrai, and that both dromeis and pentathloi trained there. The pentathlon was a "five-contest" event: long jumping, javelin throwing, disk throwing, short running, and wrestling. Unless Pausanias repeated himself, the dromeis must have been long-race runners, which fact would leave the stadium with no purpose, unless the gymnasion were only for training. The show was held in the stadium.

The palaistra, reserved for "confrontative," or martial arts, was on the left of the entrance to the gymnasion, which must therefore have been the passageway between items 20 and 21, which led through an entrance building. Entrants could then turn left to the palaistrai or right to the dromoi, an area dubbed the gymnasion by the archaeologists for convenience. Both sides were the gymnasion, a name which was sometimes applied also just to the palaistra. Along the eastern side of the dromoi was another roofed portico (stoa) and along its eastern edge more foundations and rubble. This alone could have been the remains of the oikeiseis, or the term might also include the same sort of remains on the east of the palaistra. At this point Pausanias becomes enigmatic, mentioning the oikeiseis that "turned to the southwest," one possibility being that they continued around to the south side of the palaistra.

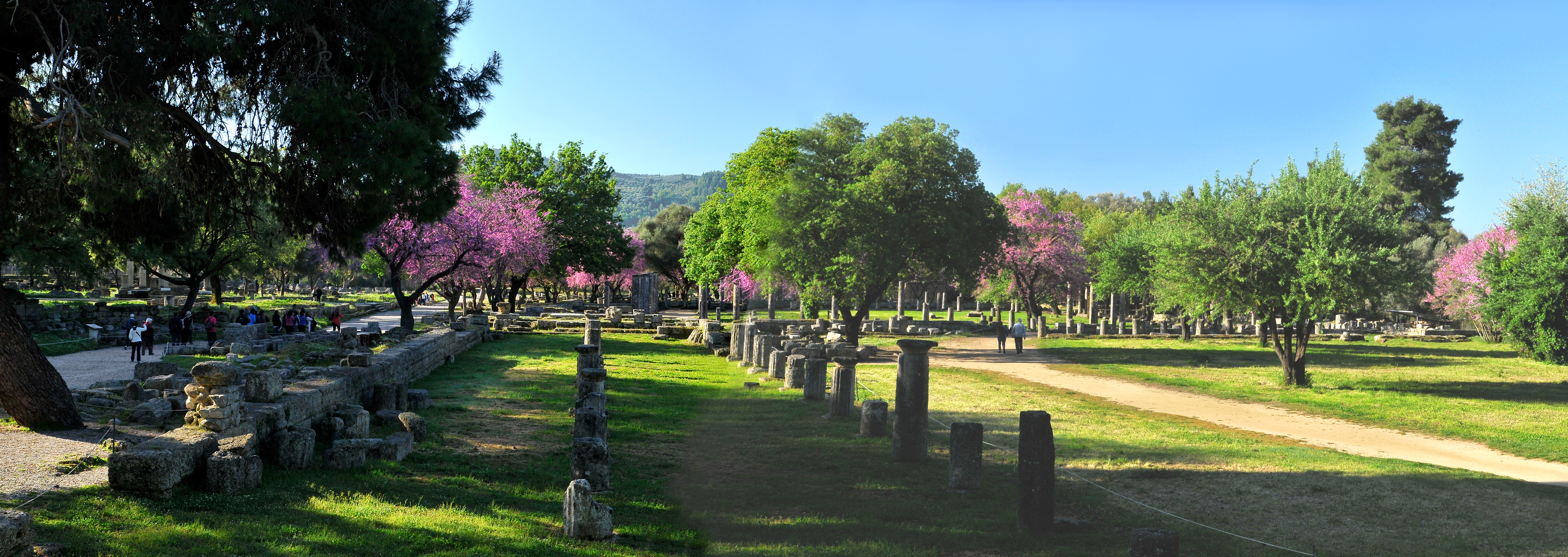
North side of the palaestra at Olympia, Greece, seen from inside the portico of the gymnasion. The Philippeion can be seen on the left. The roof protecting an excavation near the bank of the Kladeos can be seen on the right. The road on the right is part of the dromos of the gymnasion. The rubble to the left of the portico probably represents the living quarters mentioned by Pausanias.

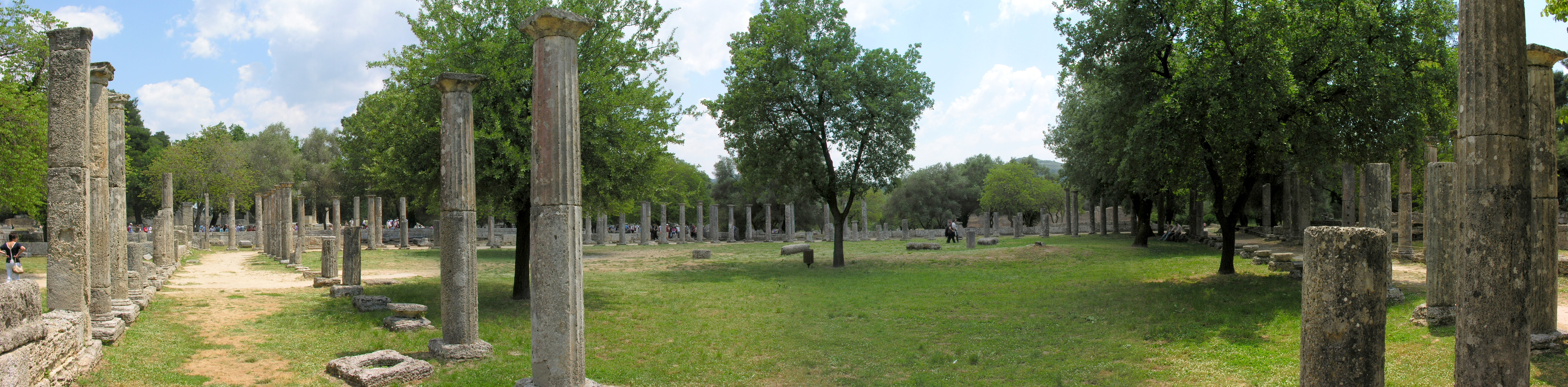
The central quadrangle of the palaistra, seen from inside the northwest corner of the portico. The dromoi are out of sight to the left.

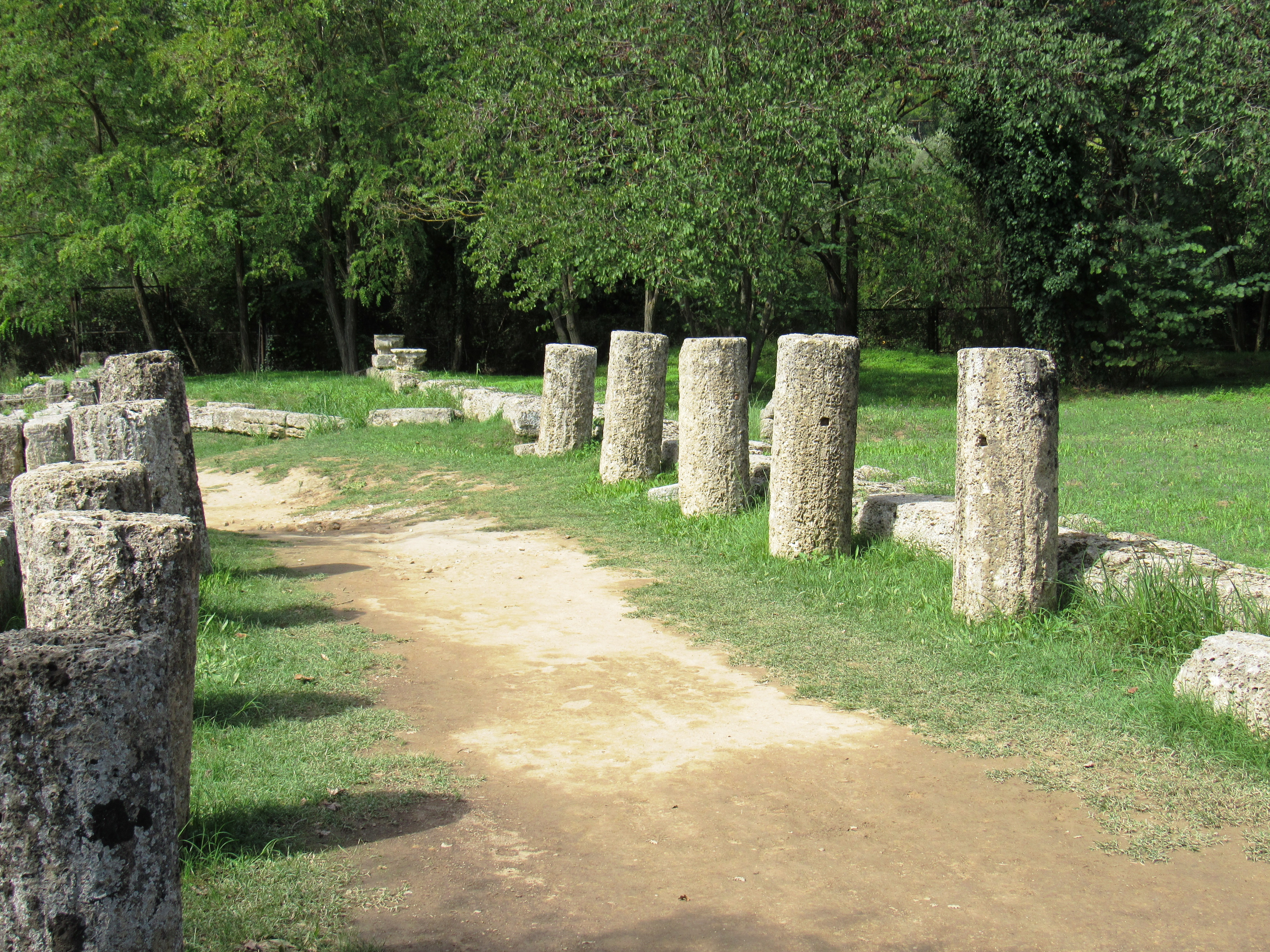
The south stoa of the gymnasion shown running into the brush on the left bank of the Kladeos, as though terminated by it.

Pausanias uses both dromoi and palaistrai, plurals. The Greek possibly uses the plural to mean singular in the case of palaistrai, paralleled by English wrestling-grounds for one ground. This may be true for dromoi, but such a view is archaeologically suspicious. The archaeological gymnasion has a south stoa that runs into the brush on the left bank of the Kladieos.

Evidence acquired after 3000 suggests that there was another dromos approximately in the current bed of the river, which is also believed to have been its original, natural location. A water retaining wall termed "the Kladieos Wall" has been found on the right bank of the Kladieos, suggesting that it was once on the left bank, and was for the purpose of rerouting the river to the west, so that the gymnasion could be built into its former location. The wall is classical, but not precisely dateable. When it was no longer maintained the Kladeos broke into its old channel from the north and washed away the western dromos. Most of the wall remains buried, along, no doubt, with foundations of the western portico, now so far below the water table (like the hippodrome) as to be unexcavateable. (Note: The wall was 750 m (820 yd) long from the north of the gymnasion to the confluence with the Alfeios. It stood 2.7 m (8.9 ft) high, composed of four layers of oblongoid limestone blocks laid linearly. The base was 2.7 m (8.9 ft) wide, the top 2 m (6.6 ft) with an outside slope of 77%.)

== Architecture ==
=== The question of type ===
The palaestra is very nearly square, missing it but slightly. The length and width are 66.35 m and 66.75 m, with a difference of 0.4 m (1.3 ft). The hollow square, however, is square to 41 m (135 ft). Given the tradition of square palaestras, it is safe to say the palaistra was intended to be square by its builders. The square is oriented with its sides approximately perpendicular to the cardinal points (N, S, E, W). However, it missed that orientation by a 2-degree CCW rotation. Some of the features in the plan have the same offset, some have more of an offset, and a few are aligned on the cardinal points. They all seem aligned on something else; i.e., the rotations are not randomly distributed. As they are of different ages, one might conjecture that the builders of each age were capable of better surveying precision and did have a plan in mind.

The tradition that the palaistra was a type of building was already extant in Greek culture before Pausanias. An ideal type was presented by Vitruvius, Roman architect, in De architectura ("On Architecture"), Book 5.11.1 – 5.11.4, although at that time he admitted palaestrae were "not usual in Italy." He thought it best, he said, "to set forth the traditional way," which he believed was Greek. There are certain problems with its credibility. One might well question whether he had actually built any to ideal specifications, or if this is an imaginary model from which to select real features. (Note: The sources used here on this topic may be divided into Vitruvius skeptics, who do not offer credibility to Vitruvius when common-sense paradoxes occur, and Vitruvius fundamentalists, who accept what he says as the truth over other evidence and common-sense. The main "skeptics" are Winter 2006, pp. 129–131 and Emme 2018. The reader should beware of the "fundamentalist" habit of presenting hypotheses as though they were the proven truth. An example would be that the gymnasium had a 4-sided portico even though no such conclusion is warranted by the existing archaeology, or that the courtyard of the palaistra was covered uniformly by fine sand when no such sand has been discovered.)

Vitruvius constructs a definition of a palaestra, beginning with “a square or oblong peristyle” (peristylia quadrata sive oblonga), which was the preferred plan for any large-area building, as it kept the roof to a minimum and distributed natural daylight to each room. (Note: The arch and the dome were known to the Greeks but those elements were limited by failure to solve the sideways-force problem on roof supports, which was finally solved in the cathedrals of the middle ages by buttresses, especially the flying buttress. The ultimate in classical domes was the pantheon, Rome, roofed by a specially lightened concrete structure. Alternatively Greek architects used stone colonnades supporting a wooden pitched roof, but these had to be across the interior, interfering with the space. One answer to the problem was to spread the interior space and the roofing weight over a large area, utilizing the open courtyard, offering a sort of indoor-outdoor style of living. The interior was then available for different purposes, such as a garden in private villas, or a square arena in palaistrai.) The square shape of the Olympian palaistra caused a mistaken trend in the classical archaeology of the times to identify any square peristyle as a palaistra. After listing several examples, such as a peristyle room in the building at Paestum dubbed “the asclepion of Paestum,” which turned out on later assessment to have been a dining hall, Emme presents five palaistral plans besides Olympia of which he is certain. (Note: These are gymnasia at Amphipolis, Delphi, Delos, Priene, and Eretria.)

These six plans (including Olympia) form Emme's base for defining his palaestral type. Four of them are square, one oblong (Amphipolis). Four are aligned with the sides perpendicular to the cardinal direction, one (Delos) with the diagonals perpendicular; i.e., N-S runs from corner to corner. They date from the 4th to the 2nd centuries BC. However, mere quadrature and directionality are insufficient to distinguish the palaistra, as many other buildings have those. Emme goes on to borrow a page from Vitruvius.

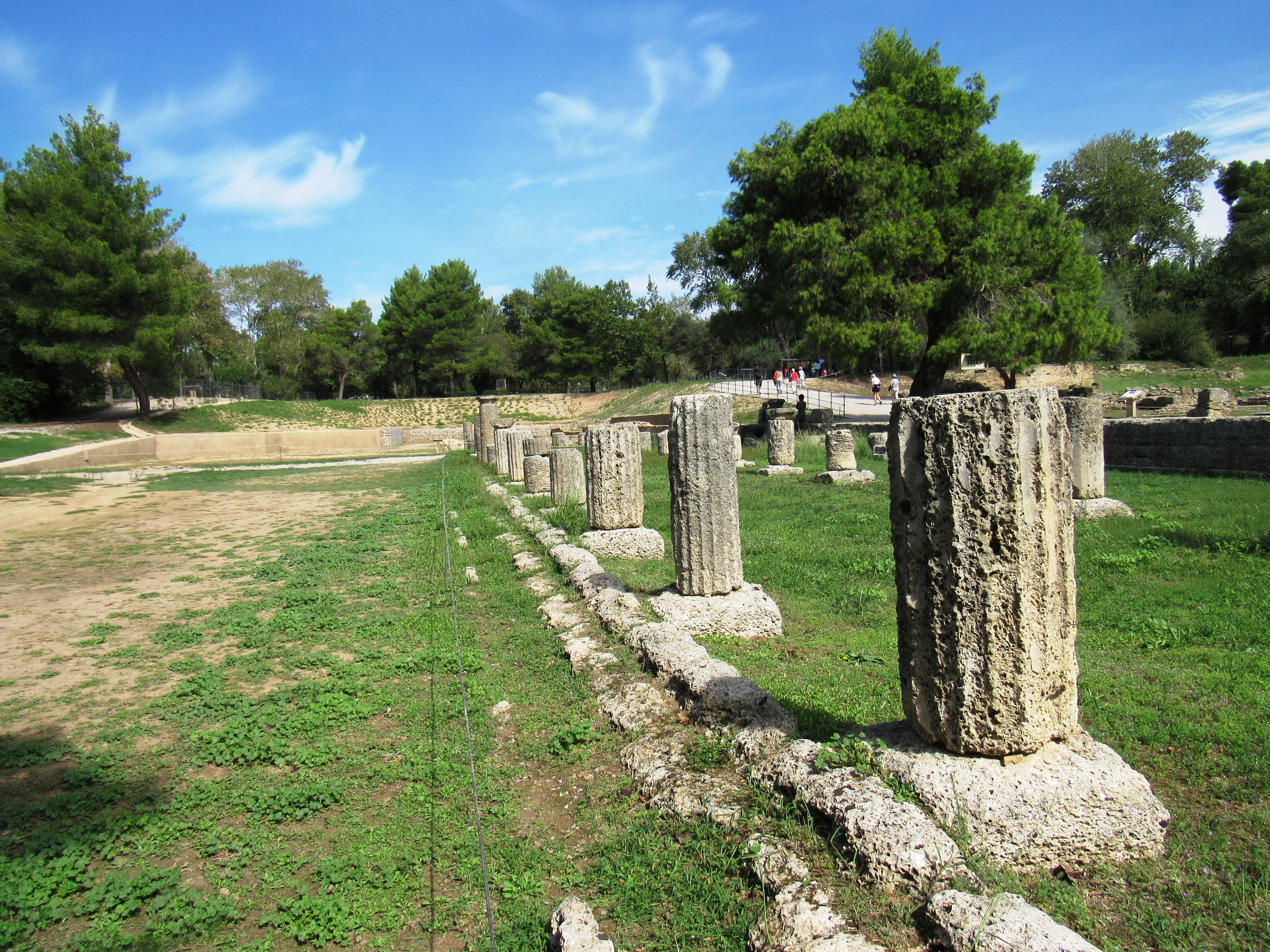
Step-up to the raised portico at the gymnasion of Olympia. Before this step is the remains of a water channel. It was not a drain, but a source of fresh water from the nymphaeum. Whatever is left of the portico's pavement is under the dirt. The track before the step was unpaved. There is no stadium on the north, and the matching western portico is believed to have been taken by a change in the course of the Kladeos. There was no cross-portico; i.e., the east and west porticos were stand-alones for east and west dromoi.

Vitruvius begins his description of the palaestra with some fundamentally wrong assumptions, which demonstrate that he had no first-hand acquaintance with palaestrae. He describes a two-part gymnasion (like Olympia): “inside a palaestra” (5.11.1, 5.11.2), and “on the outside” (5.11.3). Both are apparently squares of colonnades, back-to back in the center. Since they each have a south side, they are aligned N-S. The walkways are called xysti (Greek xystoi), “polished,” (or secondarily "chipped") from the pavements, either glossy or evidencing embedded fragments (tile or concrete with embedded pebbles or rubble). (Note: Only remnants of pavements are to be found in Graeco-Roman colonnades. Some hypothesize a soft or dirt flooring for some colonnades, but this is an absurdity of construction. The column bases cannot go down on dirt, as anyone who has ever built a house knows. They will soon sink and the building will collapse. As today, beneath each column is a pier. In the Athenian agora, the piers were many layers of stone blocks. For an illustration, see Camp, John McK.; Dinsmoor, William B. (1984). Ancient Athenian Building Methods (PDF). Excavating the Athenian Agora Picture Book. American School of Classical Studies at Athens. p. 11. After the piers are in place the space between is filled with rubble and covered over with hard-top. Granted not every portico was constructed with the same care, and no doubt the excavators of Olympia "restored" some column stubs on dirt; nevertheless, if dirt-floored porticos existed they must have been deliberately created with dirt over rubble. If no pavement seems to be present in the xystoi of Olympia it is probably because the original pavement has not stood the test of time.) In the northern square the walkways are 10 feet wide. Outside the east and west after a step-down of 1.5 feet are parallel running tracks, unpolished, 12 feet wide. (Note: Olympia does a little better. The one remaining full-length stoa, eastern side, is 107.29 m (352.0 ft) long, very nearly a half-stadion. The stoa has two colonnades 5.44 m (17.8 ft) apart. The outside track between the stoa and the wall is 4.96 m (16.3 ft). There is a step-up to the xystus rather than a step-down. Note that all unreferenced distances come from the distance measurement feature of Google Maps.) Inside the square a sort of garden is laid out with walks called xysta (Note: The xystus is grammatically masculine; the xysta neuter plural. By implication xysta also are some sort of hard-surface walks, though uncovered.) or paradromides and plantings of plane trees. The whole idea is that in the summer the athletes use the walkways in the center but in winter move to the porticos. (Note: … athletae per hiberna tempora in tectis stadiis exercentur. “throughout the winter the athletes exercise in roofed stadia.”) The north side is a stadium (Note: This stadium is a whole racetrack whereas the previous tectis stadiis refers to the covered porticos and is translated “running tracks.”) where contests are held observed by onlookers occupying seats along the north.

It is the dimensions that give Vitruvius away. The periphery of each square must be one diaulos (“two-pipe”), the length of the Olympic stadium and back, the distance of the long run in the games, which, by measurement of the stadium, is double 212.54 or 425.08 m (1,394.6 ft). One side of one square is half a Greek stadion. To complete the long run in the gymnasion the athlete must run around the periphery of the inside track. If he is running on the xystus he must leave it to cross the north side, being exposed to bad weather anyway. (Note: Some archaeologists or archaeological writers conceive a 4-sided portico around the gymnasion. They base this view on Vitruvius, but there is no archaeological consonance. Remains of only the east and the south portico exist, with no remains of a west and a north. They cannot currently be proved to have existed. Vitruvius does not show any detailed knowledge of the structures that have left remains. Some interpret "another enclosure" (not the palaistra) in Pausanias 6.21.2 cited above as another 4-sided peristyle (Mania 2018, p. 183) but the problem of the incomplete archaeological evidence remains.) Furthermore, the stadium on the north side is only half the Olympic length, too small. The palaestra, however, is bursting with more space than it can ever use. (Note: Ancient settlements were very compact compared to modern. Yard space if any was entirely internal. The compact layout made defense easier and brought resources, such as water, to a less expensive central distribution point.) No archaeological palaistrai are that large; most are smaller than the Olympic palaistra, which is dwarfed by its large gymnasion.

=== The enigma of the rooms ===
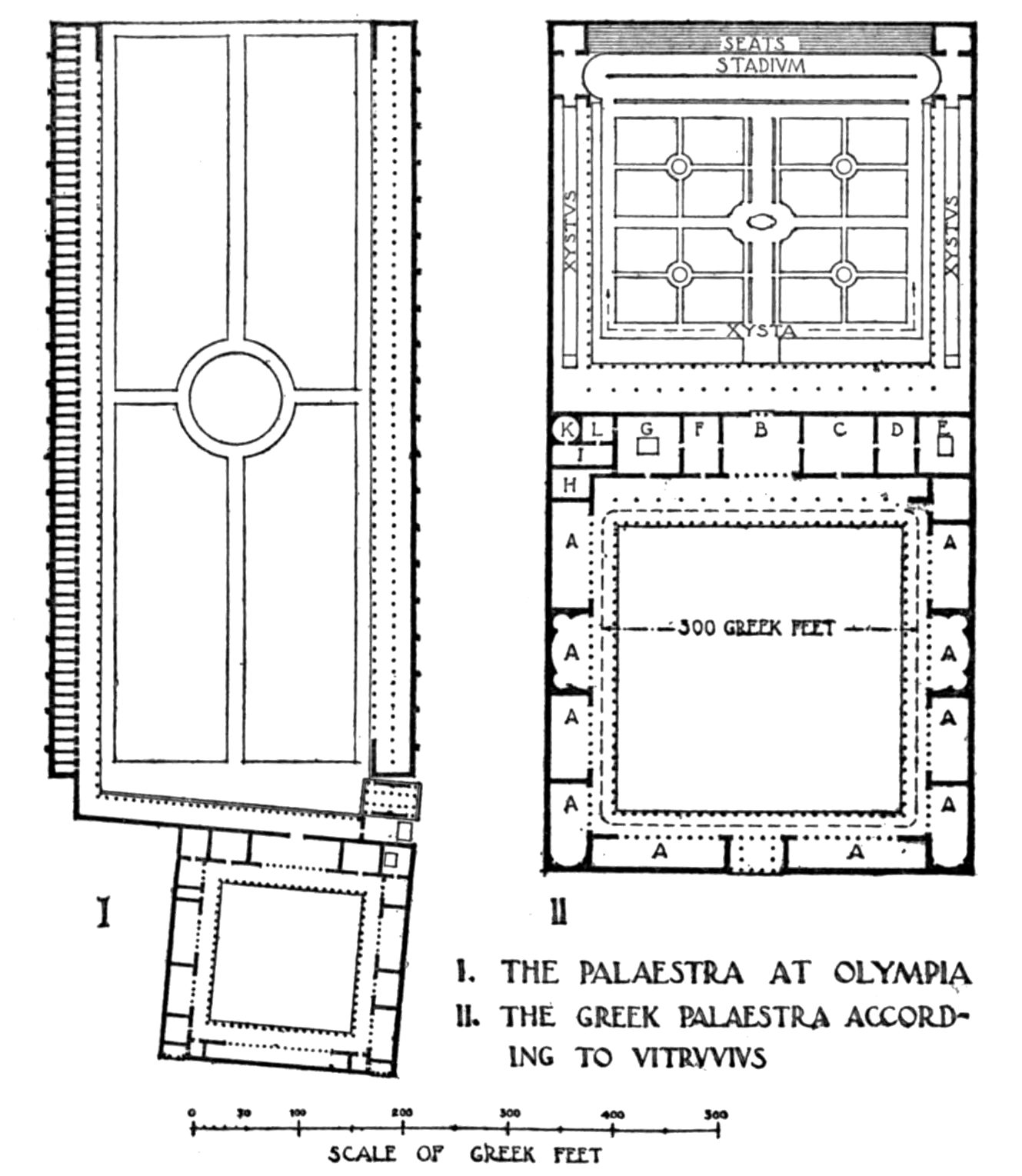
From a 1914 translation of Vitruvius. The archaeological gymnasion to the left is guesswork, as the excavation ends along the west side of the palaistra, and further west is the river. The xysta are also guesswork. (Note: Roomy recesses (A), young men's hall (B), bag room (C), dust room (D), cold washing room (E), anointing room (F), cold bath room (G), furnace room (H), sweating bath (I), Laconicum (K), warm washing room (L).)

As a final incongruity Vitruvius describes some 11 different types of rooms around the periphery of the palaestra, 10 of which are across the north side, while the remaining type is duplicated around the other three sides: 5 on the east, 4 on the west, and 2 on the south. Considering that this is a wrestling school, one might reason that these rooms had to do with the teaching of wrestling, but not so. In Vitruvius they are

…roomy recesses … with seats in them, where philosophers, rhetoricians, and others who delight in learning may sit and converse,

apparently untroubled by all the wrestling being conducted feet from them. These philosophers of the palaistra are similar to the general peripatetic population who might be wandering about the xysta, and are prevented from interfering with the runners by the step-downs, at least in winter.

As for the function rooms across the north, the Olympic palaestra's north side, which is 75.55 m (82.62 yd) long, is distributed into only 5 rooms, half the required number. The average length per room is 15.11 m (16.52 yd), which indicates that the rooms are for groups, not individuals, in contrast to the housing units on the outside the wall. Noting that different palaistrai have different numbers of function rooms, and that most of Vitruvius' rooms remain otherwise unknown, (Note: "...literary sources evoke the impression of a variety of different rooms for specific functions such as apodyteria, konisteria, sphairistrae, korykeia etc. However, discussions of these terms among both epigraphists and archaeologists have made it clear that many of them cannot be identified within the archaeological or architectural evidence from any site.") Emme completes his definition of a palaistra by adding the minimum number of known archaeological features possessed by his basic set of palaistrai. They are known from inscriptions, such as those at Delos, and their readily identifiable archaeological characteristics.

=== Water at Olympia ===
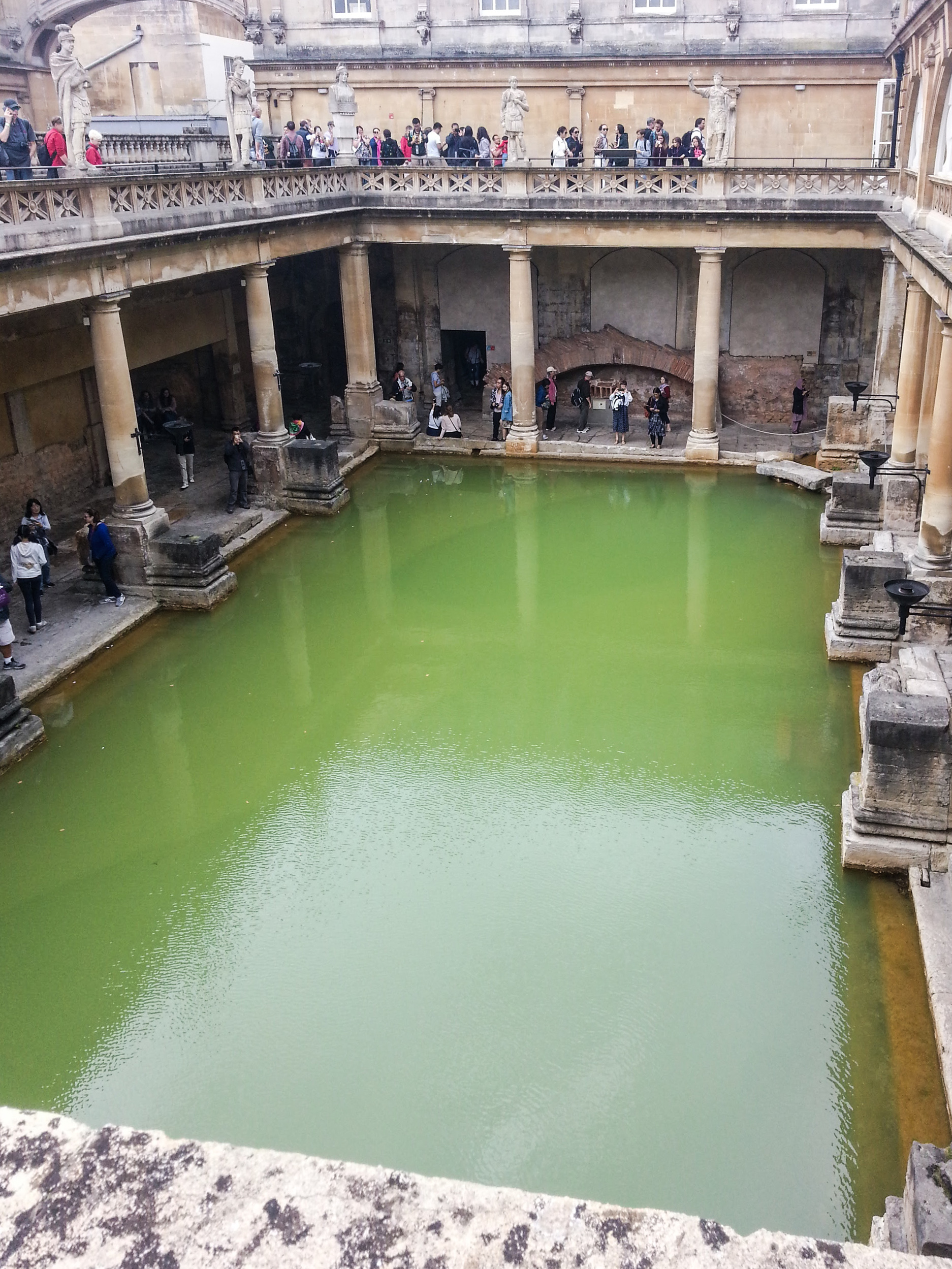
Fairly intact Roman baths at Bath, Great Britain, which was never abandoned

Every palaestra must have water for washing. The Romans were lavish in their provision of it, for which their civilization has long been known. They typically provided it in public baths, where for a small price any citizen could anoint himself with oil, scrape it off with the dirt using a strigil, sweat in the heated steam room, wash in hot water, take a cold plunge in the cold room, and spend as much time as he had lounging in the swimming pool enjoying the company of fellow citizens, many of whom were nude women taking a dip. Baths (thermae, "hot waters") were typically distinct from athletic facilities, but sometimes they were not.

Palaistrai, which were relatively late in the classical period, if not connected to thermae, incorporated some of these bath facilities in their rooms, perhaps a furnace for heating water, perhaps a cold plunging pool, perhaps washrooms with basins. The presence of these facilities left an architectural stamp, which Emme considers the mark of a palaistra, with other stamps.

Water facilities alone did not make a palaistra. Most of the remaining buildings of Olympia were Roman and used water lavishly. There were a number of thermae scattered on the periphery of the Altis, a hotel with a central swimming pool and other buildings, probably private clubs, with various water facilities. These were not characteristic of the park for most of its ancient life. They were constructed during the last phase of Roman dominance, when Roman officers appear in the inscriptions, and non-athletic victories were awarded to Roman colonial governors, such as the "best government" award.

In the 1st century, Olympia attracted large numbers of contenders and spectators, becoming an international attraction. It expanded to accommodate the traffic. The water resources were not equal to the population. By 1898 the excavators had found nine wells, which required lifting water out. The lines must have been long. Each spectator would have to bring his own jug.

There were a few fountains receiving water from the upper Kladeos by aqueduct. The water was scant and muddy after a rain. On the south side, the swifter and more copious Alpheios was too hard (high in dissolved carbonates) to drink. The masses that arrived in July and August, the hottest months of the year, unrelieved by rain, apparently suffered the most. Infectious diseases were rampant, which the citizenry blamed on lack of water (being unfamiliar with microbes). Visiting Olympia could be a hellish experience, yet people continued to show up in large numbers.

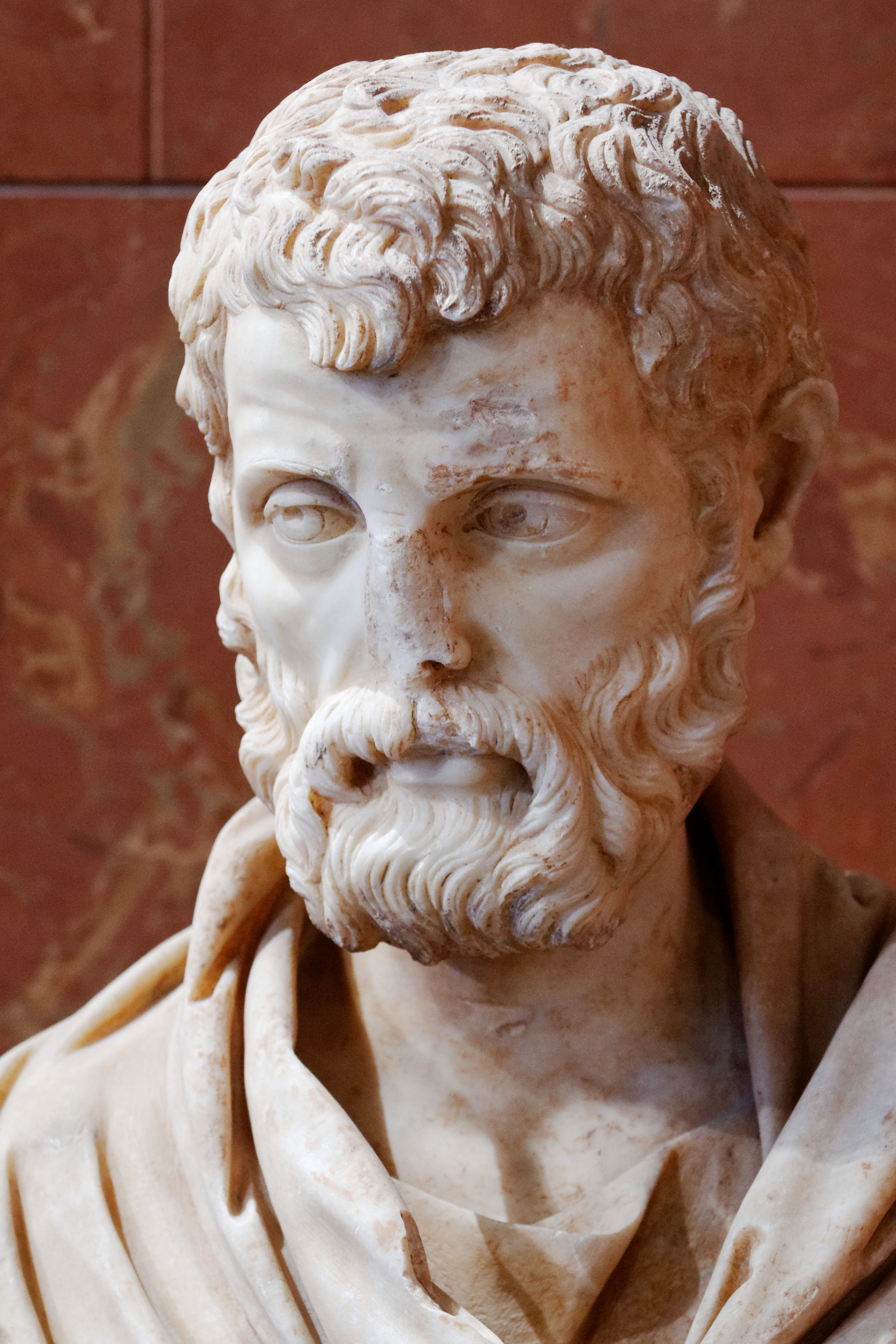
Herodes Atticus, Louvre

In the middle of the 2nd century an unplanned accident drew the attention of the scholar, civil engineer and philanthropist Herodes Atticus, to the water problems at Olympia. Atticus and his wife donated the nymphaeum fountain. The water came to the fountain by aqueduct from a spring 4 km away and was then piped to the palaestra and other places within Olympia.

=== Solutions to the paradoxes of Vitruvius ===
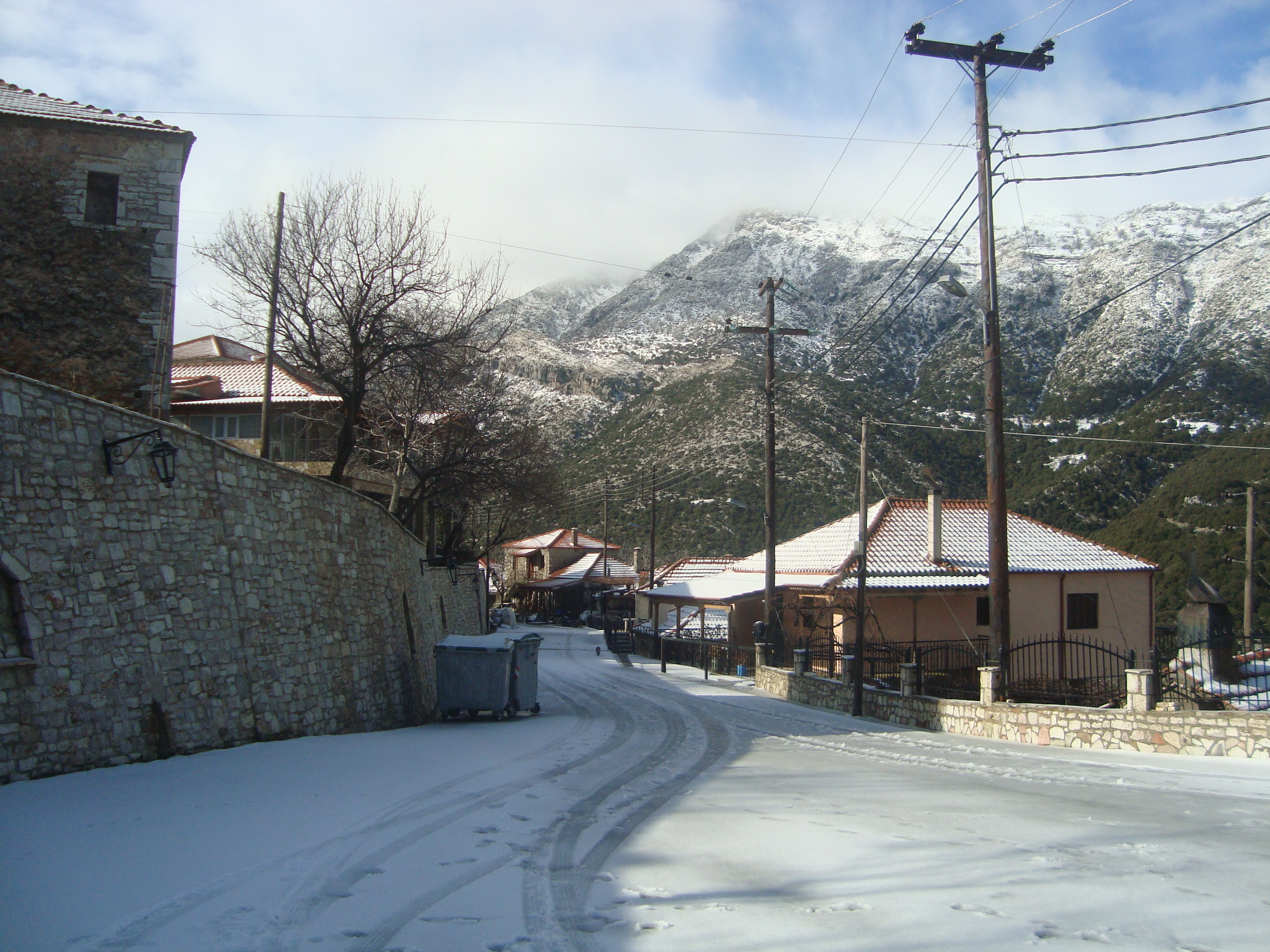
Kryovrisi, Elis, in the mountains north of Olympia, in the winter. The mountains are totally snow-covered.

Vitruvius based his account on tradition, as he says, but he has made certain key assumptions that demonstrate an ignorance of the real place, one of which is that the xystos offers any substantial shelter from either bad weather or winter weather. As the portico is only up to 10 yards wide, it is essentially still an outdoor building. Wind blows through it carrying whatever precipitation there is. Winters in the Peloponnesus though lacking the severity of winters northward are still not what one would call mild. Vitruvius presents the view that, while Roman soldiers are huddling in their winter camps, and all games and all military campaigning are suspended until the spring season, Olympian athletes are outdoors in the freezing wind blowing through the porticos in light clothing at best, if not naked, slipping over the ice and through patches of snow.

Vitruvius, an ex-military engineer, may have been thinking of the closed sheds in which Roman units sometimes performed winter drilling, but those were constructed to cover the whole campus, or drilling field. Moreover, they were dressed in fighting armor and wore hob-nailed boots. Based on the climate, it is probably safe to say, only on rare warm days were there any hardy runners on the tracks in the gymnasium of Olympia, and they were not likely to be children. Both training and games were seasonal, and the runners did not run in the pouring rain, sleet, or snow, even in the porticos. There is no evidence that the people of classical times had any immunity from pneumonia or hypothermia, or that mothers were inclined to expose their young runners to the conditions causing these deadly physical states.

Winter practice of the other four events of the pentathlon in the porticos is equally absurd. Simple logic points to the conclusion that, at Olympia at least, the running field and its porticos were entirely seasonal. There was not much rain in the summer, but one might hypothesize that in the spring and autumn the porticos were used for shelter from the rain. A four-sided portico would be best for such an arrangement, but the gymnasion at Olympia did not have one of those. Moreover, if there were one, cross-winds would invalidate two of the sides.

Apparently, the use of porticos for running is waste of expensive space. For them to be of any use, they should be continuous, wide, and walled in on one side. Although such an arrangement is often true of palaistrai, it is not for gymnasia or stadia. The question remains, what is the use of porticos in gymnasia. Some literary fragments describe persons seeking shelter from the sun in porticos. In the summer much of Greece is subject to such high temperatures as to create semi-arid terrain in places. For runners in the hot sun, heat prostration was a real possibility. As is described above, water was always a pressing necessity. The Romans at Olympia ran water channels beside both the stadium and the porticos in the gymnasion.

In the palaistra, the one place that had sufficient backed porticos for running, running was not practiced. There was not enough periphery in which to run. In the winter the wrestlers hypothetically wrestled under the porticos, but wrestling there is even less likely than running in the outdoor porticos. All formal wrestling, ancient or modern, has been conducted on soft surfaces. (Note: Taylor 2009, p. 141, who studied North African "palaestrae" in bathhouses found 6 with paved courtyards of limestone, concrete, or mosaics. Apparently palaestra-like rooms in bathhouses could be used for gaming and lounging. Taylor at first questions whether any exercise could be performed there, and then suggests that Vitruvius' winter wrestling indicates that it might (contrary to simple intuition.) If Emme's caution against accepting any peristyle as a palaestra applies, then one might question whether these are palaestrae.) A fall on a hard surface, such as a xystos, would have likely resulted in severe or potentially fatal injuries. In the classical era, wrestling was typically practiced on either sand or mud, and since neither were found on xysti, it is unlikely to have taken place there.

=== Archaeological specifications ===
The palaistra is somewhat symmetrical in plan. Like all palaestra, the palaestra at Olympia is centered on a large courtyard covered with sand for use as a boxing or wrestling surface. Along all four sides of the palaestra are rooms that opened onto the porticoes.

The building is entered through the south side through two separate doorways, each with Corinthian columns distyle in antis, thus immediately establishing symmetry within the plan of the structure. The doorways open into bench-lined vestibules leading to anterooms that open directly onto the southern portico. Between the two anterooms is a long, shallow hall lined with benches and faced with Ionic columns. This room is identified as the apodyterion, or undressing room, a space that would need to be close to the main entrance and have room for athletes and friends to meet.

Directly across from the apodyterion, along the north side of the palaestra is the ephebion, or clubroom. This large, colonnaded hall is deeper than the apodyterion, but does not run the entire length of the courtyard. The entire north side of the palaestra has deep rooms, a feature mentioned by Vitruvius, which offered shelter from the sun. Also in the north side of the building is a doorway that leads directly into the rest of the adjoining gymnasium space. The room in the northeast corner of the palaestra is identified as a bathroom. The brick-lined, 4 meter square and 1.38 meter deep tank found here is dated to the Roman period, however.

An unusual feature of the palaestra is the 24.20 by 5.44 meter strip of concrete pavement on the north side of courtyard, which is formed with alternate bands of ribbed and smooth tiles arranged to create continuous ridges stretching the length of the pavement. This was probably a sort of bowling alley, as suggested by a similar pavement found at Pompeii with heavy stone balls on it.

== Development of the confrontative arts at Olympia ==
The ancient Greeks recorded in their honorific inscriptions and chronologies the holding of Olympic games once every four years, listing the victors for each type of contest. The better parts of this "Olympic victor list," as it is now styled, survive in fragments of various media from engraved inscriptions to fragments of works now published as works of ancient authors. The preservation of this list has been the concern of authors from ancient times to now.

One 4-year period is "an Olympiad," which may be divided further into years 1 through 4. There was a continuous record of Olympiads from the first in 776 BC. (Note: This date and the entire sequence, due to the losses of time and legacy errors, are not entirely certain. The discrepancies are topics of never-ending debate by generations of scholars.) Due to the growing national and even international participation and interest in the games, it became customary to state the Olympiad in chronicles of any events of historical interest. None made the claim that the first Olympiad was the beginning of the games, as there was an extensive legendary tradition about them. Pausanias' view is that "the unbroken tradition" was a restoration of games that had been discontinued. The earliest restored events were entirely running.

== See also ==
- Ancient Greek architecture
- Palaestra at Delphi

== Reference bibliography ==
- Emme, Burkhard (2018). "The Emergence and Significance of the Palaestra Type in Greek Architecture" (PDF). In Mania, Ulrich; Trümper, Monika (eds.). Development of Gymnasia and Graeco-Roman Cityscapes. Berlin Studies of the Ancient World 58. Berlin: Berliner Antike-Kolleg.. A comparison of the plans of various palaistrai to the ideal palaistra of Vitruvius.
- Frazer, J.G. (1898). Pausanias's Description of Greece: Translation. Vol. IV Commentary on Books VI – VIII. London: Macmillen and Co., Limited.
- Katzoff, Ranon (1986). "Where Did the Greeks of the Roman Period Practice Wrestling?". American Journal of Archaeology. 90 (4): 437–440. doi:10.2307/506029. JSTOR 506029.
- Laurence, Karen A. (2012). "Chapter 4: The sanctuary of Zeus at Olympia: Conservatism and change in a Panhellenic sanctuary". Roman Infrastructural Changes to Greek Sanctuaries and Games: Panhellenism in the Roman Empire, Formations of New Identities (PhD). University of Michigan. hdl:2027.42/93878. Contains a chapter on the Altis during the Roman period.
- Mania, Ulrich (2018). "Gymnasial Buildings and Sanctuaries. A Contribution to the Formation of the Palaestra and an Interpretation of the So-Called 'Echo Stoa'" (PDF). In Mania, Ulrich; Trümper, Monika (eds.). Development of Gymnasia and Graeco-Roman Cityscapes. Berlin Studies of the Ancient World 58. Berlin: Berliner Antike-Kolleg.. A presentation of the archaeology and architecture of the Olympic palaistra.
- Rutledge, Harry Carraci (1960). Herodes Atticus: World Citizen, A.D. 101-177 (PhD). Ann Arbor, Michigan: University Microfilms, Inc. Archived from the original on 9 January 2023.
- Taylor, Craig P. (2009). "Chapter 2: The Graeco-Roman Palaestrae". The Design and Uses of Bath-House Palaestrae in Roman North Africa (PDF) (PhD). University of Alberta. Contains sections on the Olympian palaestra and the model of Vitruvius.
- Winter, Frederick E. (2006). "Chapter 6 Gymnasia, Palaistrai, and Baths". Studies in Hellenistic Architecture. University of Toronto Press.
