= Palaestra =

Ancient wrestling school

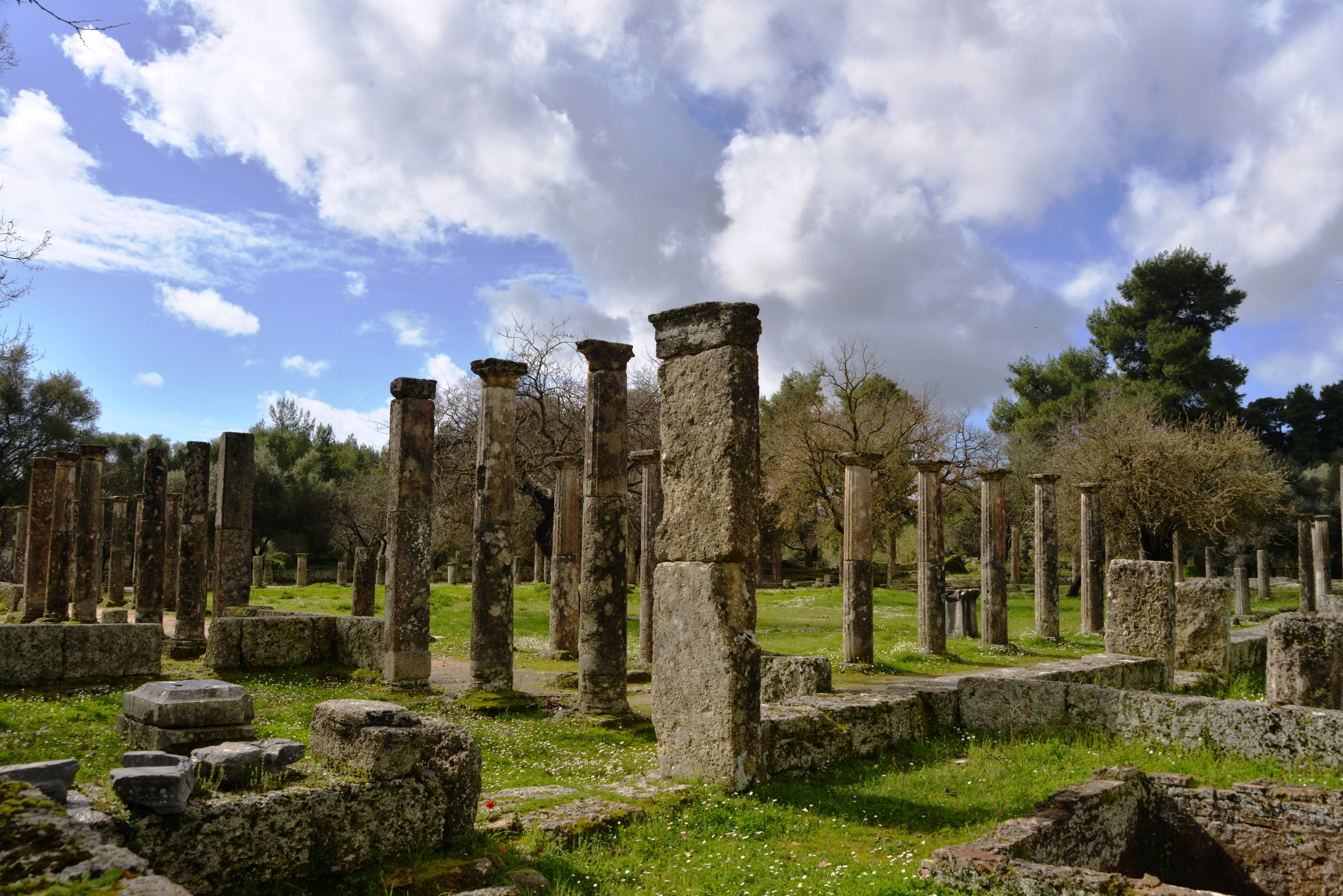
The palaestra at Olympia, Greece

A palaestra or palestra (/pəˈliːstrə/, /-ˈlaɪ-/ or /-ˈlɛ-/; Ancient Greek: παλαίστρα) was any site of a Greek wrestling school in antiquity. Events requiring little space, such as boxing and wrestling, occurred there. Palaistrai functioned both independently and as a part of public gymnasia; a palaestra could exist without a gymnasium, but no gymnasium existed without a palaestra.

== Etymology ==
Compare ancient Greek palaiein – "to wrestle" and palē – "wrestling".

A palaestrophylax or palaistrophulax (παλαιστροφύλαξ) was the guardian or the director of a palaestra.

== Architecture ==
=== Greek ===
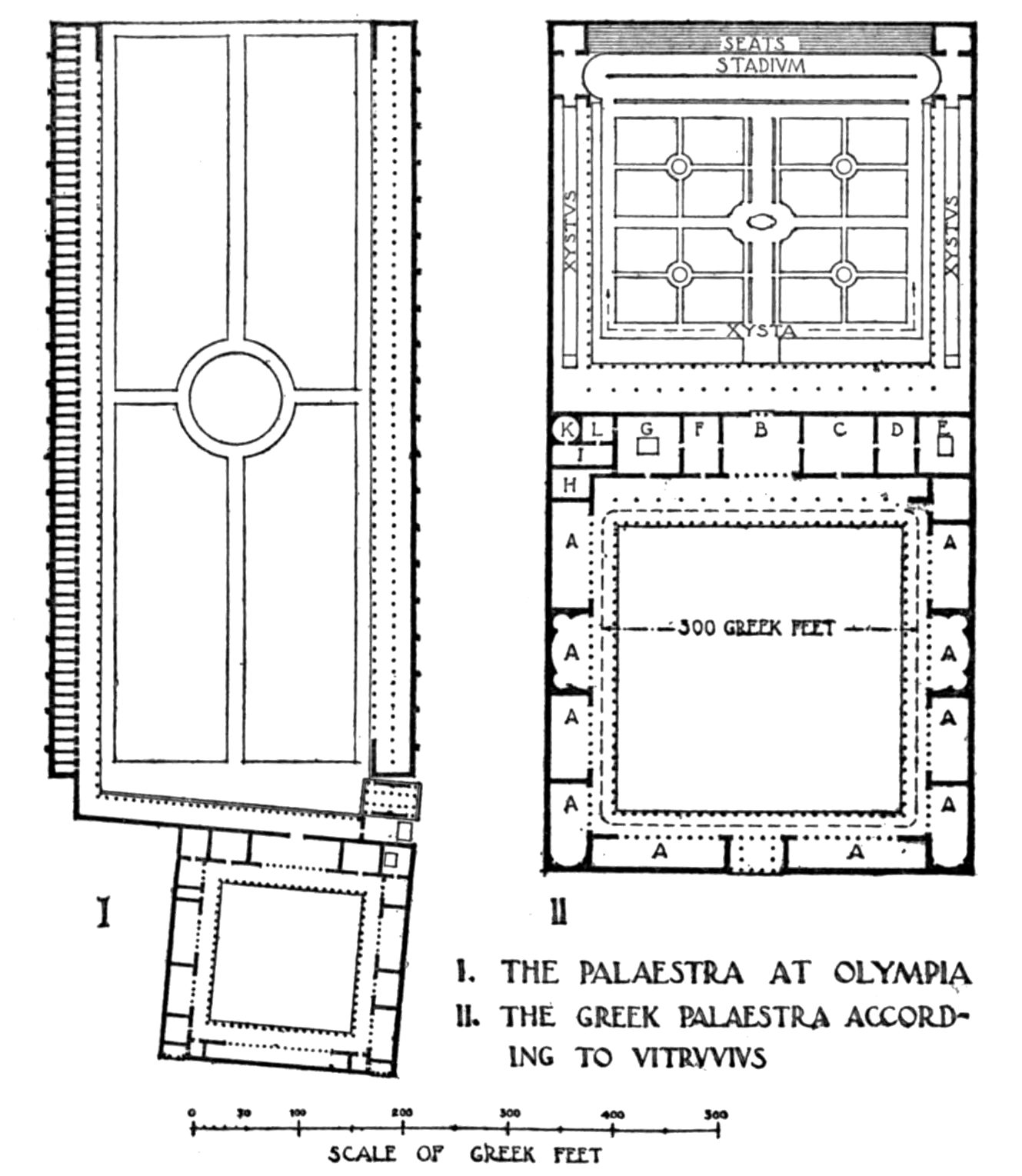
Plan of the palaestra at Olympia (left) and reconstruction of Vitruvius' description of the palaestra (right), from a 1914 translation of Vitruvius. The plan on the left incorporates guesswork, as the west side has been eroded by a river (the oblique angle is forced by the wider layout of the sanctuary). The xysta are also guesswork. On the right, the letters indicate: Exedrae (A), ephebeum (B), punching-bag room (C), conisterium (D), cold washing room (E), oil storeroom (F), cold bath room (G), furnace room (H), sauna (I), Laconicum (K), hot bath (L).

The architecture of the palaestra, although allowing for some variation, followed a distinct, standard plan. The palaestra essentially consisted of a rectangular court surrounded by colonnades with adjoining rooms. These rooms might house a variety of functions: bathing, ball playing, undressing and storage of clothes, seating for socializing, observation, or instruction, and storage of oil, dust or athletic equipment. Good examples of this building type come from two major Greek sites: Olympia and Delphi.

Vitruvius, through his text De architectura, is an important ancient source about this building type and provides a description of the Palaestra, "as constructed by the Greeks" in Book 5, chapter 11. Although the specifics of his descriptions do not always correspond to the architectural evidence, probably because he was a Roman author primarily interested in Italian architecture, his account provides insight into the general design and uses of this type of space. As Vitruvius describes it, the palaestra was square or rectangular in shape with colonnades along all four sides creating porticoes, with a total internal perimeter of two stadia (the length of the diaulos race, thus modern scholars sometimes refer to this whole structure as a diaulos). The portico on the northern side of the palaestra was of double depth to protect against the weather. Rounded halls with seats (exedrae, ἐξέδραι) were built along the single depth sides of the palaestra for the use of philosophers, orators, and other scholars. The double-depth side was divided into three sections. In the centre was a larger exedra (ephebeum) for use by the ephebes (young adult men undergoing state-run education/military training). On the left there was a punching bag room (coryceum, κωρυκεῖον), a storeroom for sand/powder used to improve wrestlers' grip (conisterium, κονιστἠριον), and a room for cold bathing (loutrón, λουτρόν). On the right there was an oil storeroom (elaeothesium, ἐλαιοθέσιον), a cold pool (frigidarium), a furnace (propnigeum, προπνίγειον), a vaulted sauna (sudatio), a dry sweating-room (laconicum), and a hot bath. To the north of the palaestra was a second courtyard, surrounded by porticoes on three sides, but open on the north. One of these porticoes was double-width and contained a covered wrestling arena (ξυστός, Romanised as "xystus") for use during inclement weather. The space between the three porticoes contained walkways lined with trees (xysta to the Romans, παραδρομίδες, "paradromides" to the Greeks).

=== Roman baths ===
During the Roman Imperial period the palaestra was often combined with, or joined to, a full bathing complex. When the Arabs and the Turks adopted the tradition of Roman baths as the hammam, they did not continue the tradition of the attached palaestra.

== See also ==
- Palaestra at Olympia
- Palaestra at Delphi
