= Xystus (architectural term) =

Portico in an ancient Greek gymnasium

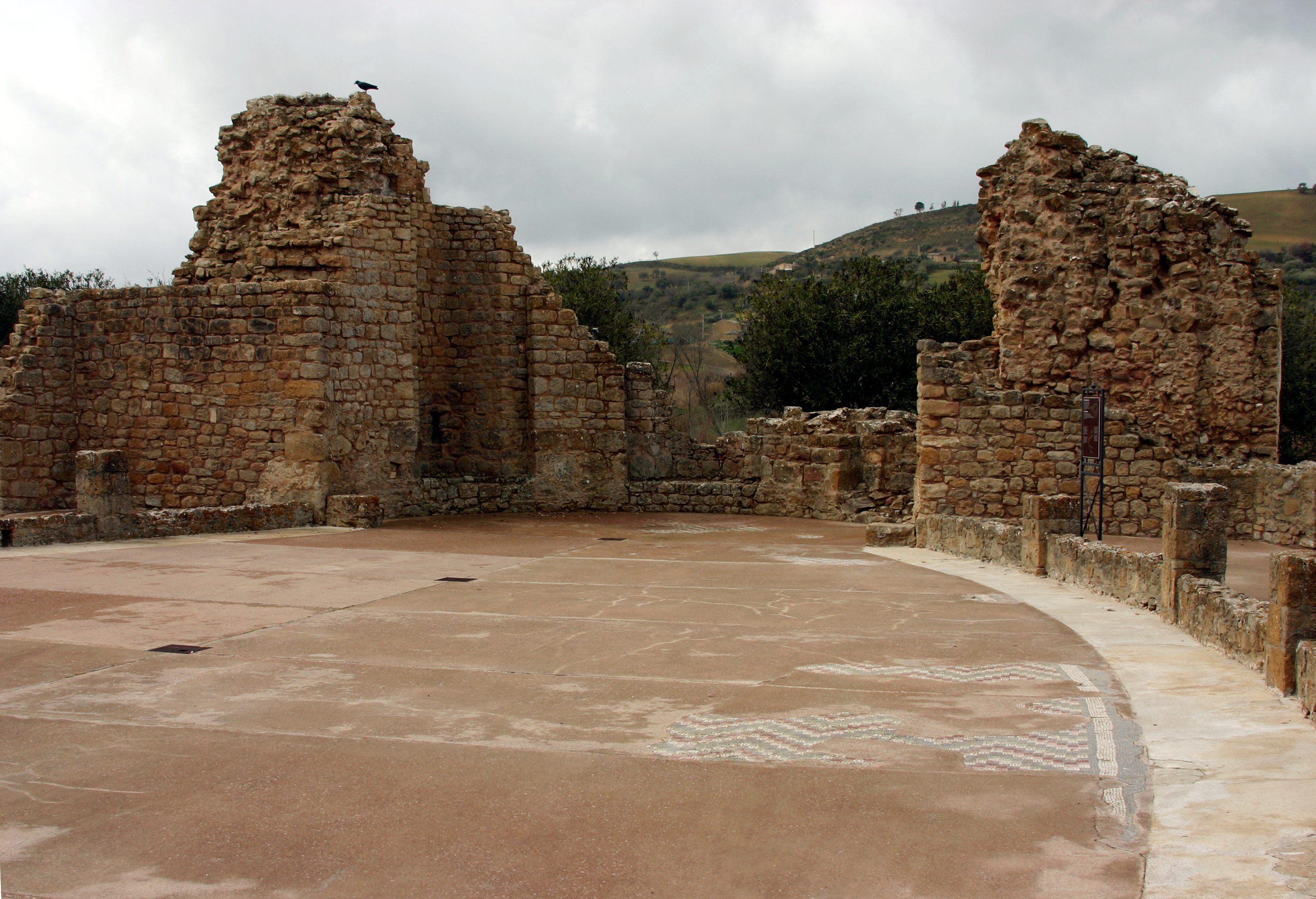
The xystus at Villa Romana del Casale, Sicily

Xystus (Ancient Greek: ξυστός) was originally the ancient Greek architectural term for the covered portico of the gymnasium, in which the exercises took place during the winter or in rainy weather.

The ancient Romans applied the term to a covered garden walk with porticoes for winter exercise, or to a promenade between rows of large trees.

The term xystus derives from the Greek word xustos, meaning "smooth", due to the polished floor of the xystus. "Xystus" was used, by extension, to refer to the whole building containing the gymnasium and portico, as in the xysti of Jerusalem and Elis. Xyst is an alternative spelling for xystus, and xystarch as the term for a superintendent of a xystus. In Latin, xystum is the accusative case of the nominative xystus; in modern architecture, xystum has a different meaning from xystus.

Xystarches (ξυστάρχης) was an officer who superintended the exercise of the xystus and xysticus (ξυστικός) was called an athlete who practised in xystus.

== Notable xysti ==
- Hadrian's Villa at Tivoli
- the Villa of the Quintilii near Rome
- The Xystus of Jerusalem was a famous building erected in the Judaeo-Hellenistic period probably under Herodian rule.
- The Xystus of Elis was a famous gymnasium consisting of a vast enclosure surrounded by a wall. The gymnasium was by far the largest in ancient Greece, because all the athletes in the Olympic Games were required to undergo one month's training there prior to the opening of the games. Within the Xystus, there were special places for runners; these places were separated from each other by plane trees.
