= Taenia (architecture) =

Element of Doric columns in classical architecture

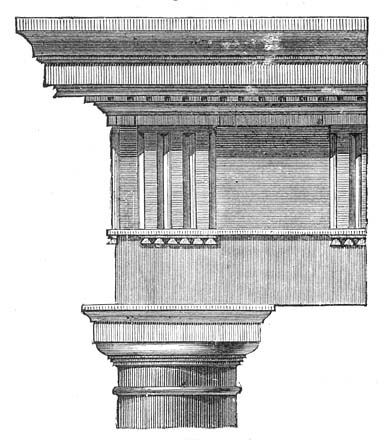
Horizontal taenia pictured as a shadow under the cymatium (to either side of the gutta) in the Roman Doric order at the Theater of Marcellus

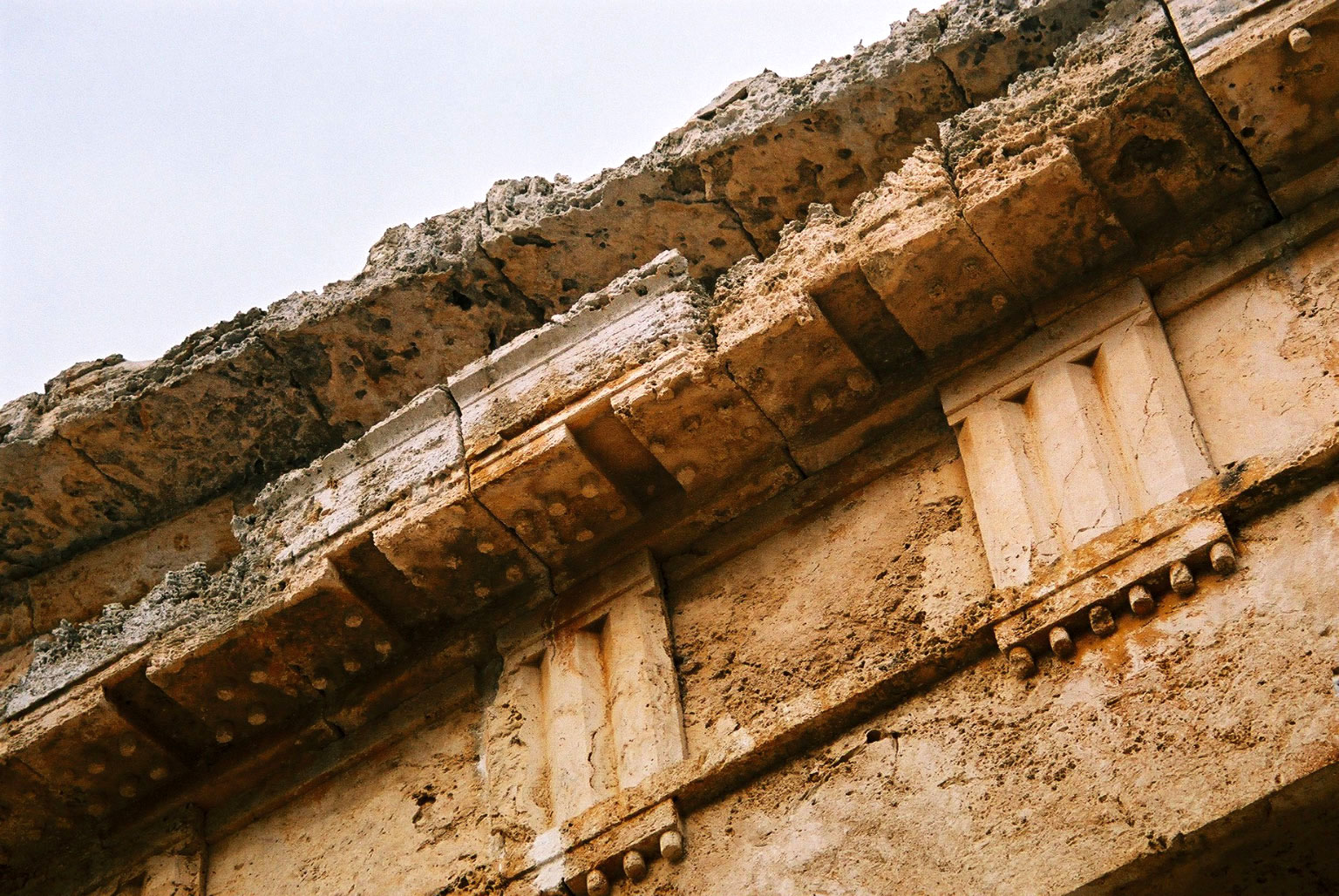
Detail of the entablature at the Temple of Segesta

In classical architecture, a taenia (Latin: taenia, from Ancient Greek ταινία (tainía) 'band, ribbon') is a small "fillet" molding near the top of the architrave in a Doric column. The entire structure above the columns is called the entablature. It is commonly divided into the architrave, directly above the columns; the frieze, a strip with no horizontal molding, which is ornamented in all but the Tuscan order; and the cornice, the projecting and protective member at the top.

The architrave, the lowest band, is split from bottom to top into the broad fascia, the guttae or "drips" (below the triglyph in the frieze), and the taenia (below the projecting cymatium).

== See also ==
- Classical order
- Roman architecture
