= Villa Lante al Gianicolo =

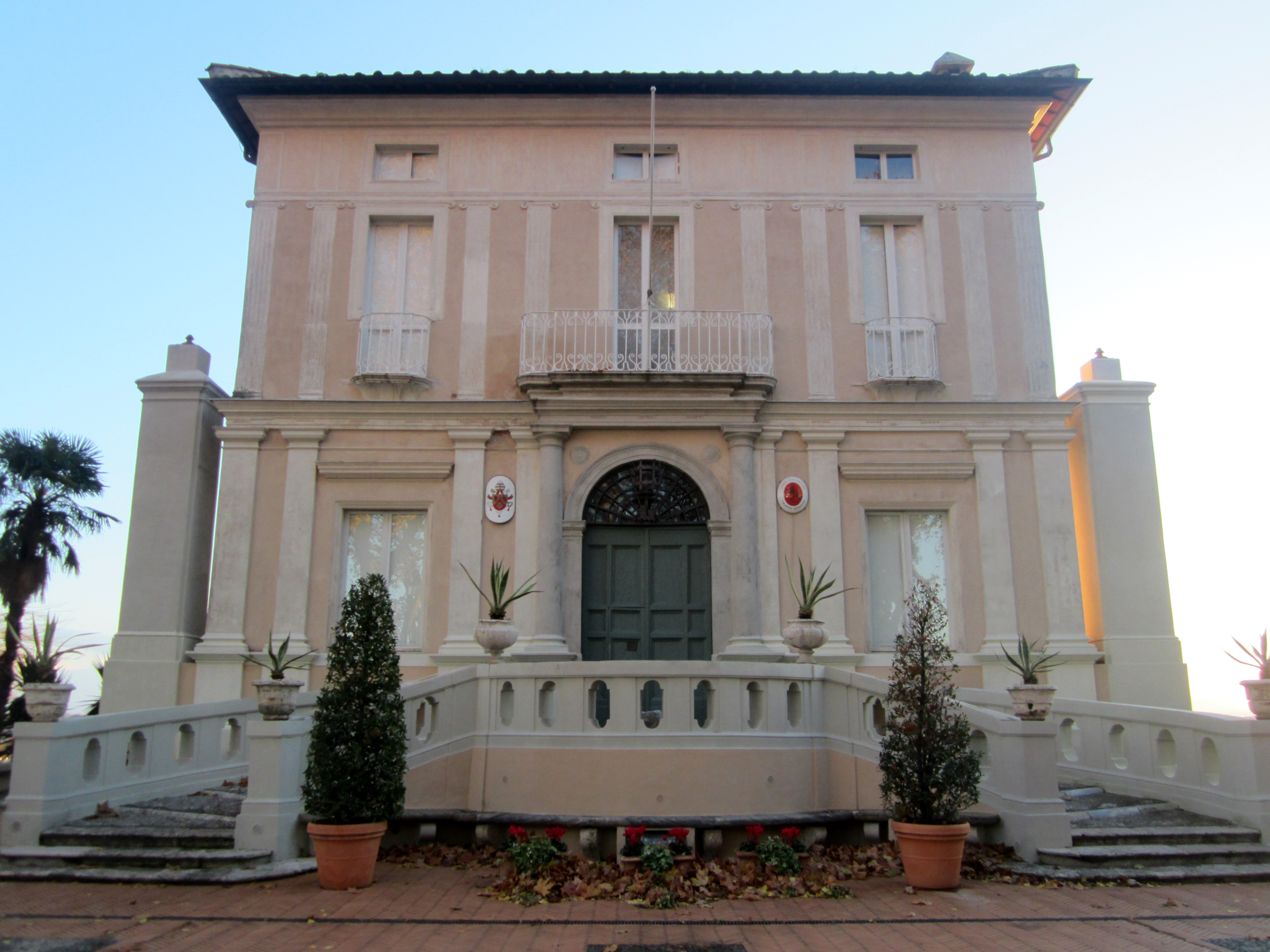
- View of Villa Lante, entrance facade
- Click on the map for a fullscreen view

General information
- Location: Rome
- Coordinates: 41°53′35.14″N 12°27′38.51″E

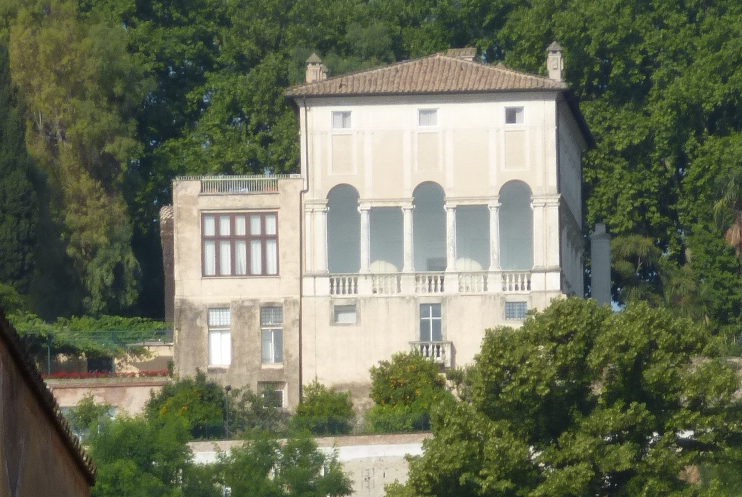
The loggia side from Trastevere below

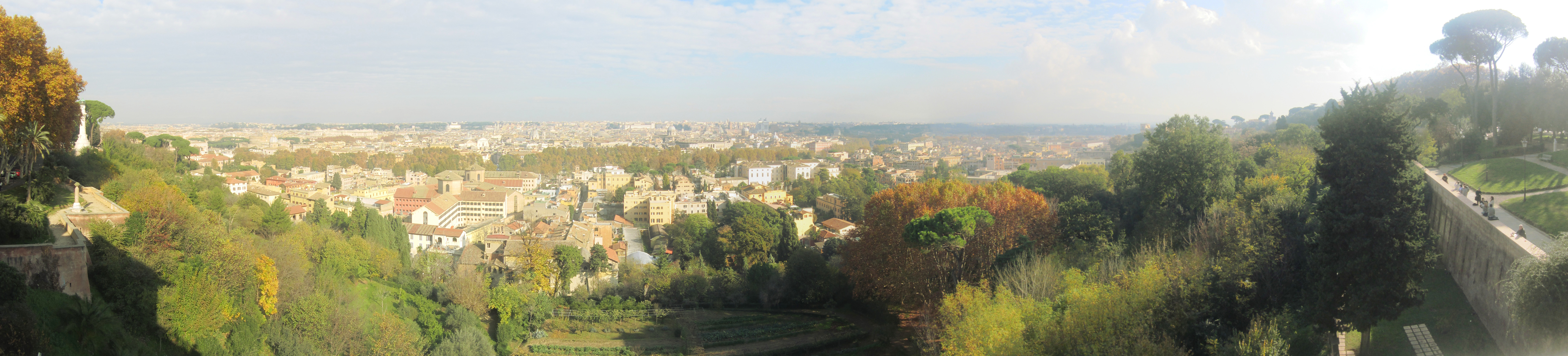
The view from the loggia

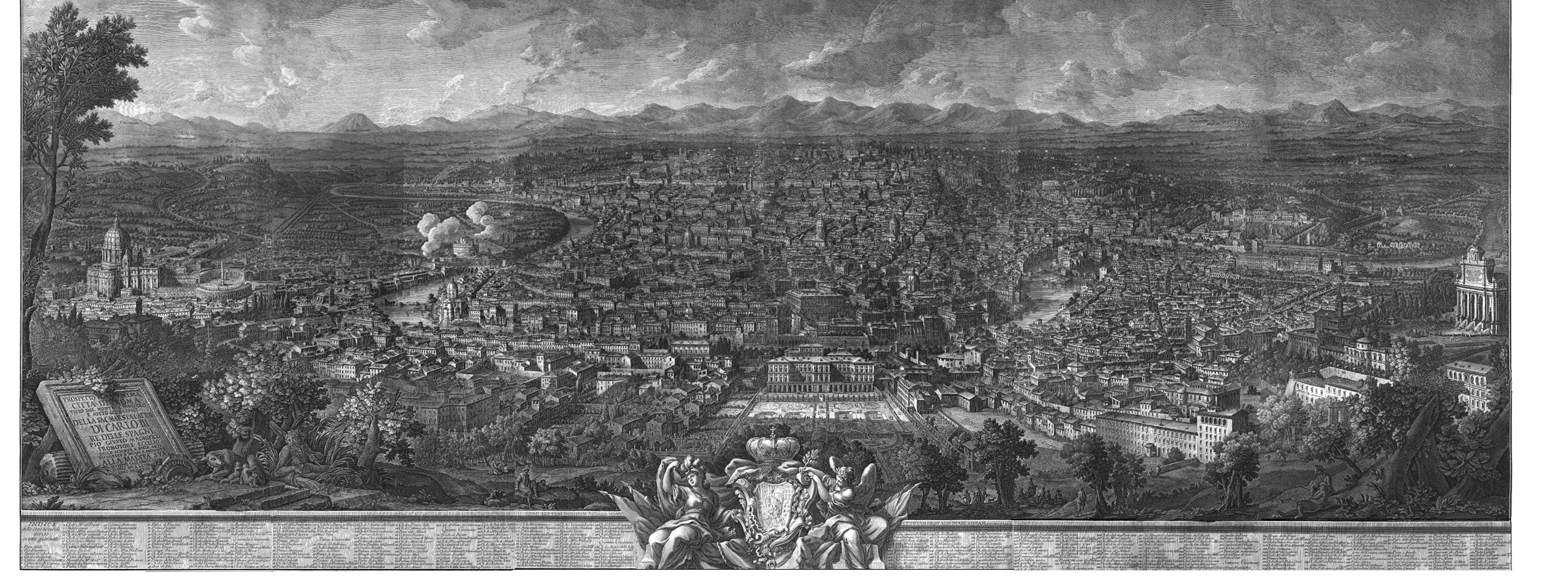
Giuseppe Vasi's Prospetto dell’alma città di Roma visto dal Monte Gianicolo, a famous large etching (1765) of the view (click for lighter, expanded image).

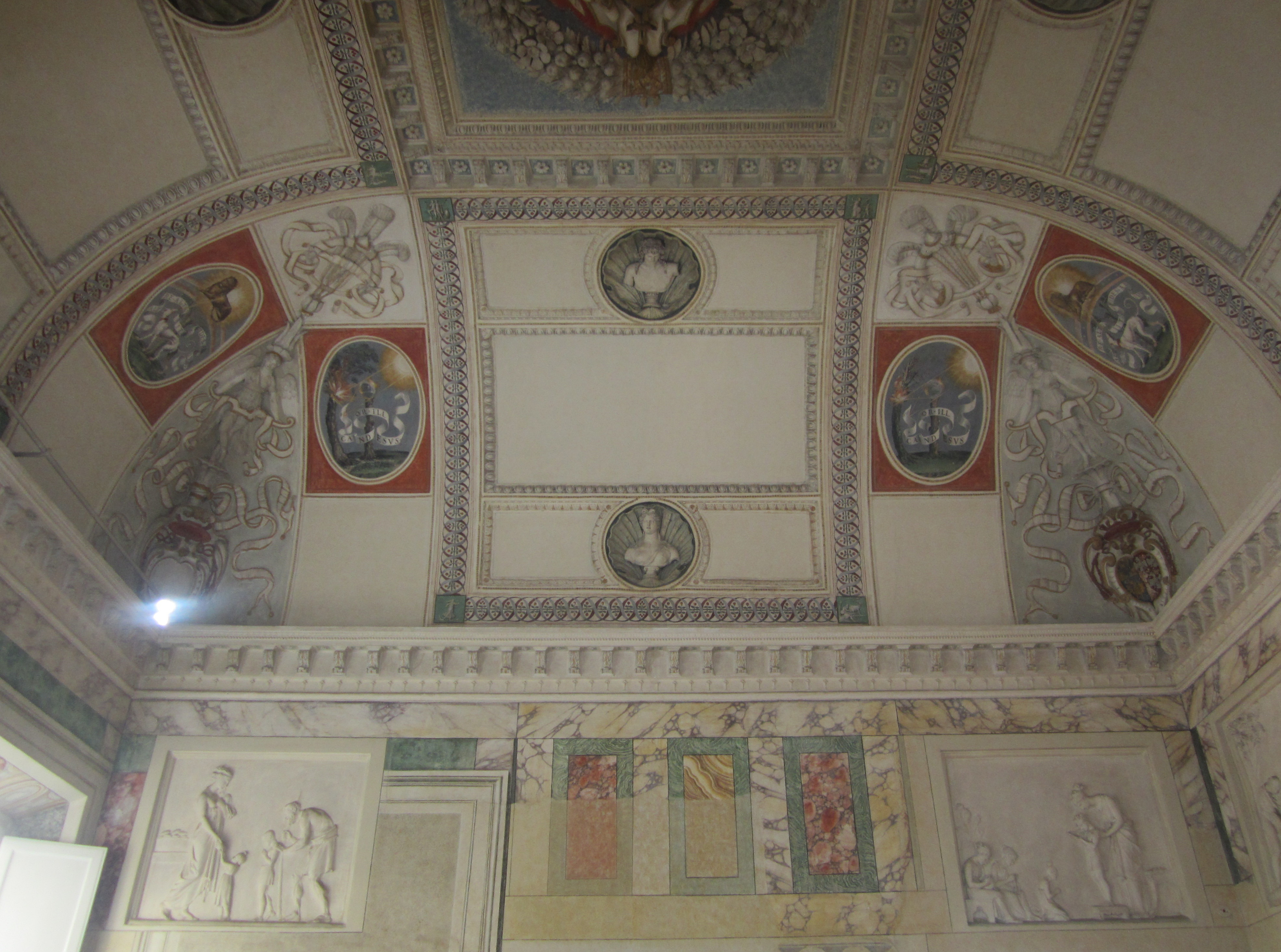
Interior view

Villa Lante al Gianicolo is a villa in Rome on the Janiculum Hill (Gianicolo). It is a summer house designed by Giulio Romano in 1520-21 for Baldassare Turini, as one of Romano's first independent commissions after the death of his master Raphael. The site was believed to have been that of the house of the Roman poet Martial, and the new villa was built on the same footprint as the surviving ruins, with a view facing Rome. Today, the property is owned by the Republic of Finland through Senate Properties, and the building houses the Institutum Romanum Finlandiae and the Embassy of Finland to the Holy See.

== Architecture ==
The site is on the edge of the flat top of the Janiculum Hill, which here begins to slope steeply down terraces, and the large loggia built facing the view is on the same level as the front door on the other side of the house, which is reached by some gentle steps from the entrance courtyard. But below the loggia there is a considerable drop to the ground, and after a narrow garden terrace, another sharp drop to the next terrace below. To the side of the house a larger garden on a flat terrace also gives splendid views; unlike the house itself this is open to the public.

Turini was a Papal official (the "datary") who was a close friend of Raphael, and supervised the building of his tomb in the Pantheon, Rome. Raphael would no doubt have been the architect if he had lived longer, and may have made plans for it before his death. The building repeats many features of the Villa Madama, which was further advanced by Raphael's death, and also taken over by Giulio Romano.

Romano made the whole building suggest lightness and elegance to exploit the ridge-top position and overcome the rather small Roman footprint. The orders are delicate, with Tuscan or Doric columns and pilasters in pairs on the main floor, and extremely shallow Ionic pilasters above, whose presence is mainly conveyed by a different colour. Alternate loggia openings are heightened by arches above the entablature. Romano's willingness to play with the conventions of the classical orders is already in evidence; the Doric here has guttae but no triglyphs on its narrow entablature. The volutes of the Ionic capitals of the entrance facade are repeated in the window surrounds between them: "The canonic orders here begin to be treated visually as independent from their structural purposes, and this liberation offered the architect new expressive possibilities."

There are extensive frescos and decoration in stucco in the rooms, carried out by Raphael's workshop team under the supervision of Giulio Romano, with Polidoro da Caravaggio probably playing a leading part. These had subjects from Roman history designed to appeal to Pope Leo X, who died in 1521 before they were completed. Turini lost his job in the brief reign of Pope Adrian VI (1522–23), and they were not completed until he resumed it in 1523. Other parts of the interior decoration, including the Neoclassical reliefs, date from a redecoration at the beginning of the 19th century.

== Artists recording the view ==
One of Martial's Epigrams, which is now inscribed on a tablet in the loggia, describes the view from his house (which in fact seems to have been on the Quirinal Hill): "Hinc septem dominos videre montis et totam licet aestimare Romam" ("From this point you can see the seven hills and appreciate Rome in its entirety"). In fact this would be true of a number of points on the hill.

The view of the city was one of the most famous, and recorded by many artists. Giorgio Vasari made his Grand View of Rome from there, or very close by, though he slightly adjusted the slopes at the sides to expand what is actually visible from there, as did Giuseppe Vasi's Prospetto dell’alma città di Roma visto dal Monte Gianicolo, a famous large etching (1765) of the view. J. M. W. Turner did a drawing with watercolour in 1819.

== Later history ==
The villa came into the ownership of Ippolito Lante Montefeltro della Rovere, Duke of Bomarzo, during the 17th century; he also owned the Viterbo Villa Lante. The Lante family became impoverished by the early 19th century and had to sell the villa. Later owners include the German archaeologist Wolfgang Helbig, in the late 19th century. The southern elevation of Castle Goring, a magnificent country house in Sussex, England, is thought to be modelled on the Villa Lante.
