= Gutta =

Small cone-shaped projection used in the architrave of the Doric order

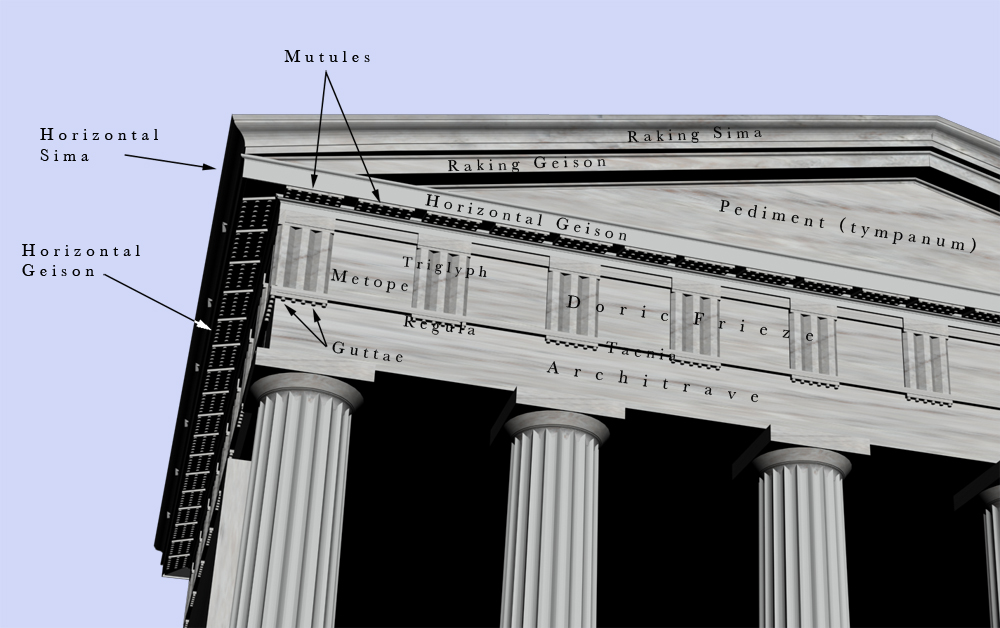
Labelled image of the Doric order entablature

A gutta (Latin pl. guttae, "drops") is a small water-repelling, cone-shaped projection used near the top of the architrave of the Doric order in classical architecture. At the top of the architrave blocks, a row of six guttae below the narrow projection of the taenia (fillet) formed an element called a regula. A regula was aligned under each triglyph of the Doric frieze. In addition, the underside of the projecting geison above the frieze had rectangular protrusions termed mutules that each had three rows of six guttae. These mutules were aligned above each triglyph and each metope.

It is thought that the guttae were a skeuomorphic representation of the pegs used in the construction of the wooden structures that preceded the familiar Greek architecture in stone. However, they have some functionality, as water drips over the edges, away from the edge of the building.

== Outside the Doric ==
In the strict tradition of classical architecture, a set of guttae always go with a triglyph above (and vice versa), and the pair of features are only found in entablatures using the Doric order. In Renaissance and later architecture these strict conventions are sometimes abandoned, and guttae and triglyphs, alone or together, may be used somewhat randomly as ornaments. The Doric order of the Villa Lante al Gianicolo in Rome, an early work of Giulio Romano (1520–21), has a narrow "simplified entablature" with guttae but no tryglyphs. The stone fireplace in the Oval Office has Ionic columns at the side, but the decorative wreath in the centre of the lintel has sets of guttae below (only five to a set). The Baroque Černín Palace in Prague (1660s) has triglyphs and guttae as ornaments at the top of arches, in a facade using an eclectic Ionic order.

== Gallery ==
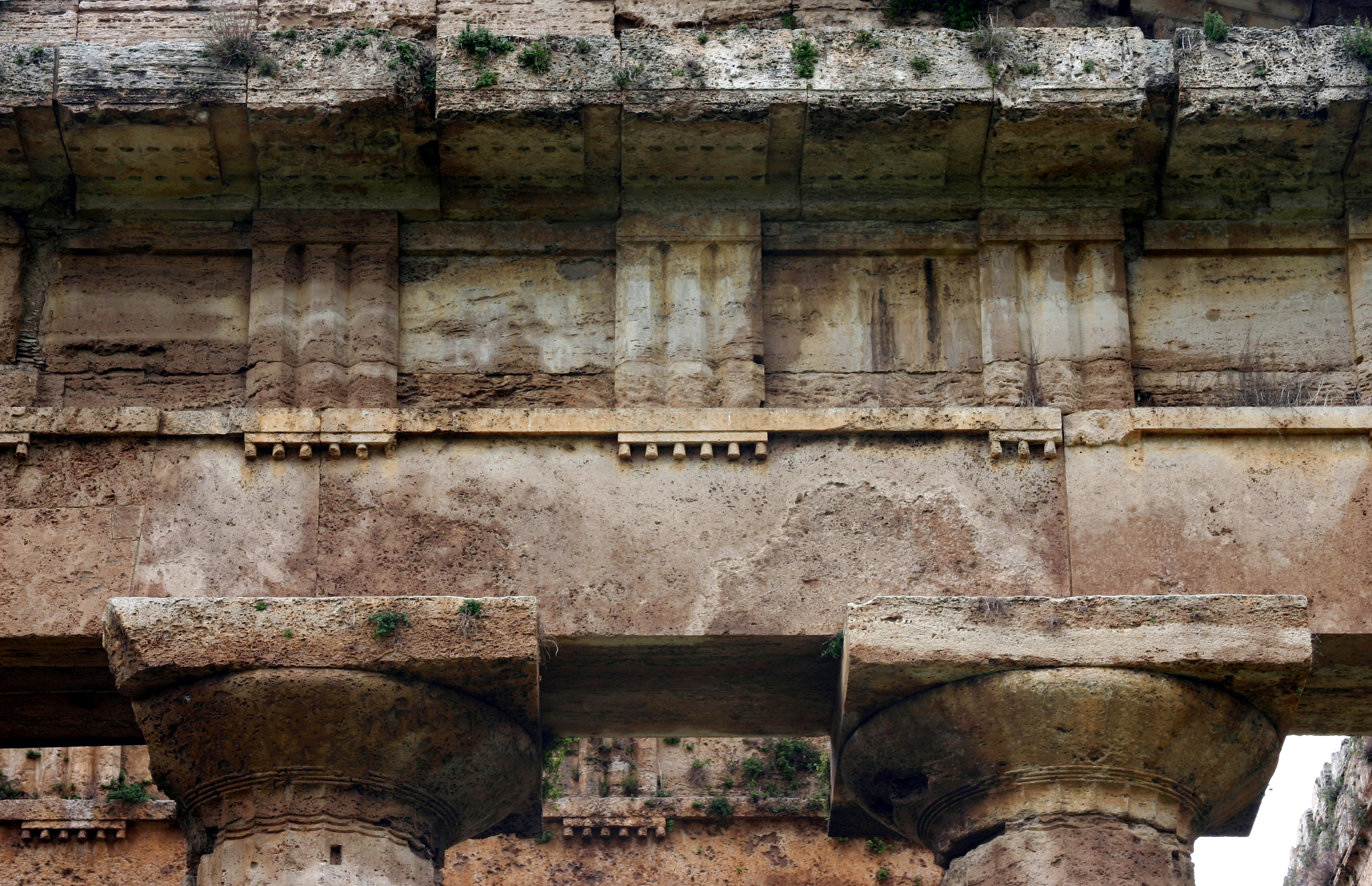
So-called "Temple of Poseidon", Paestum, Italy.

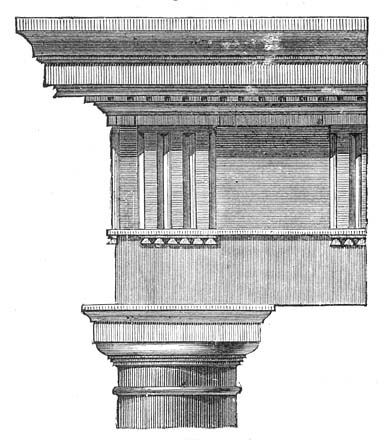
Theater of Marcellus: cone-shaped guttae pictured below the triglyph in the Doric order.

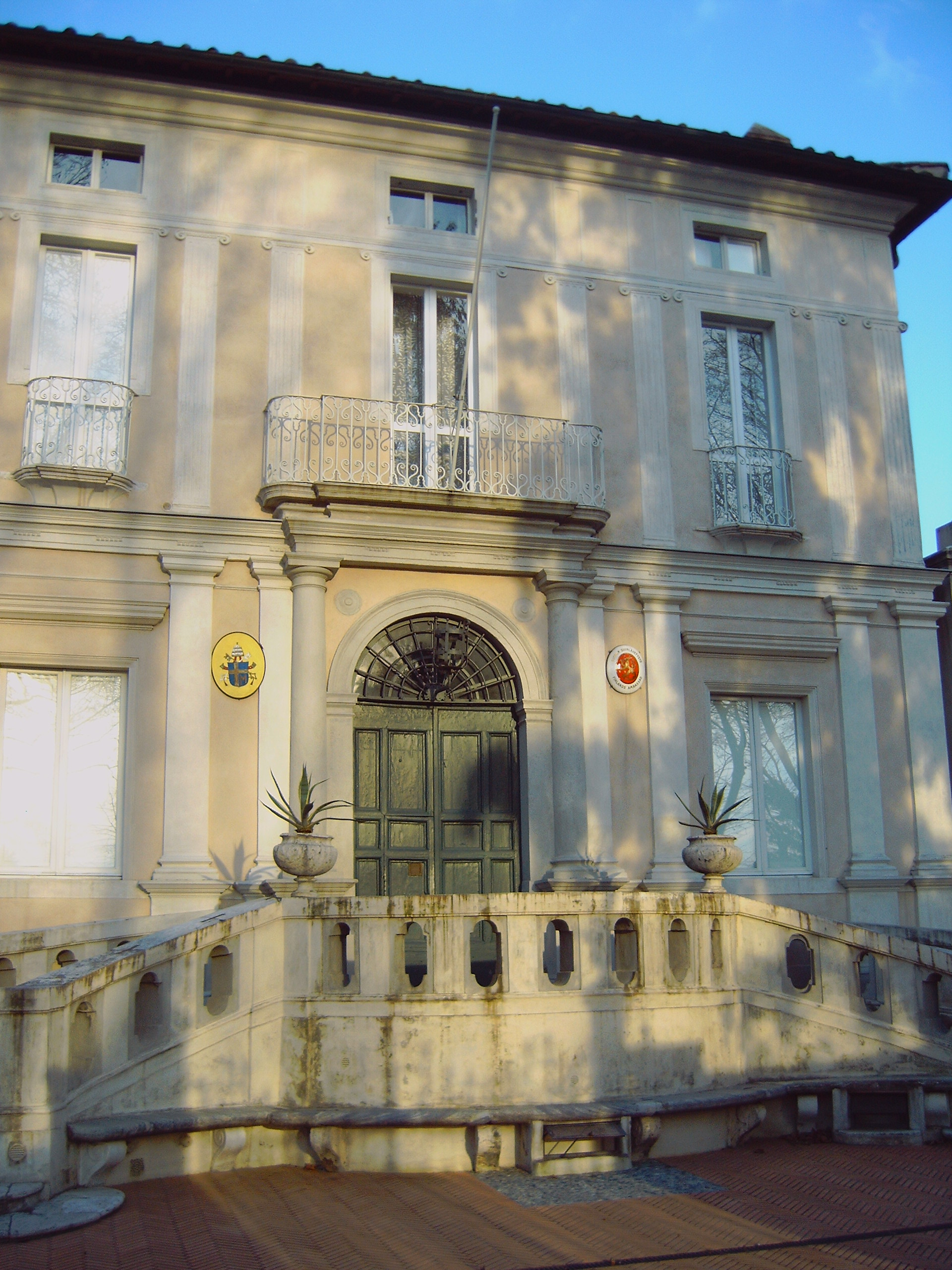
Villa Lante al Gianicolo, guttae but no triglphs. Giulio Romano, 1520–21.

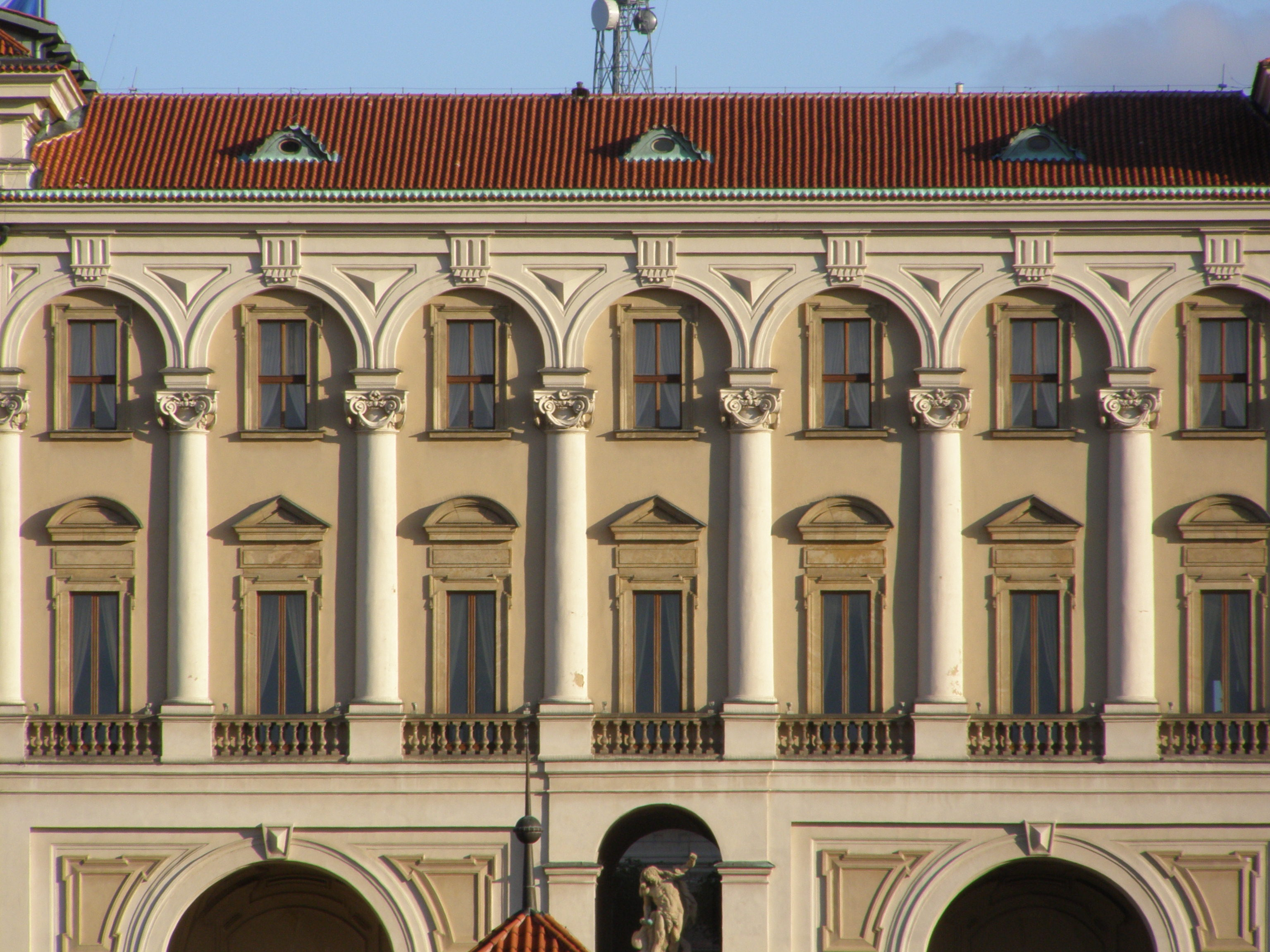
Černín Palace in Prague (1660s) has triglyphs and guttae as ornaments at the top of arches.

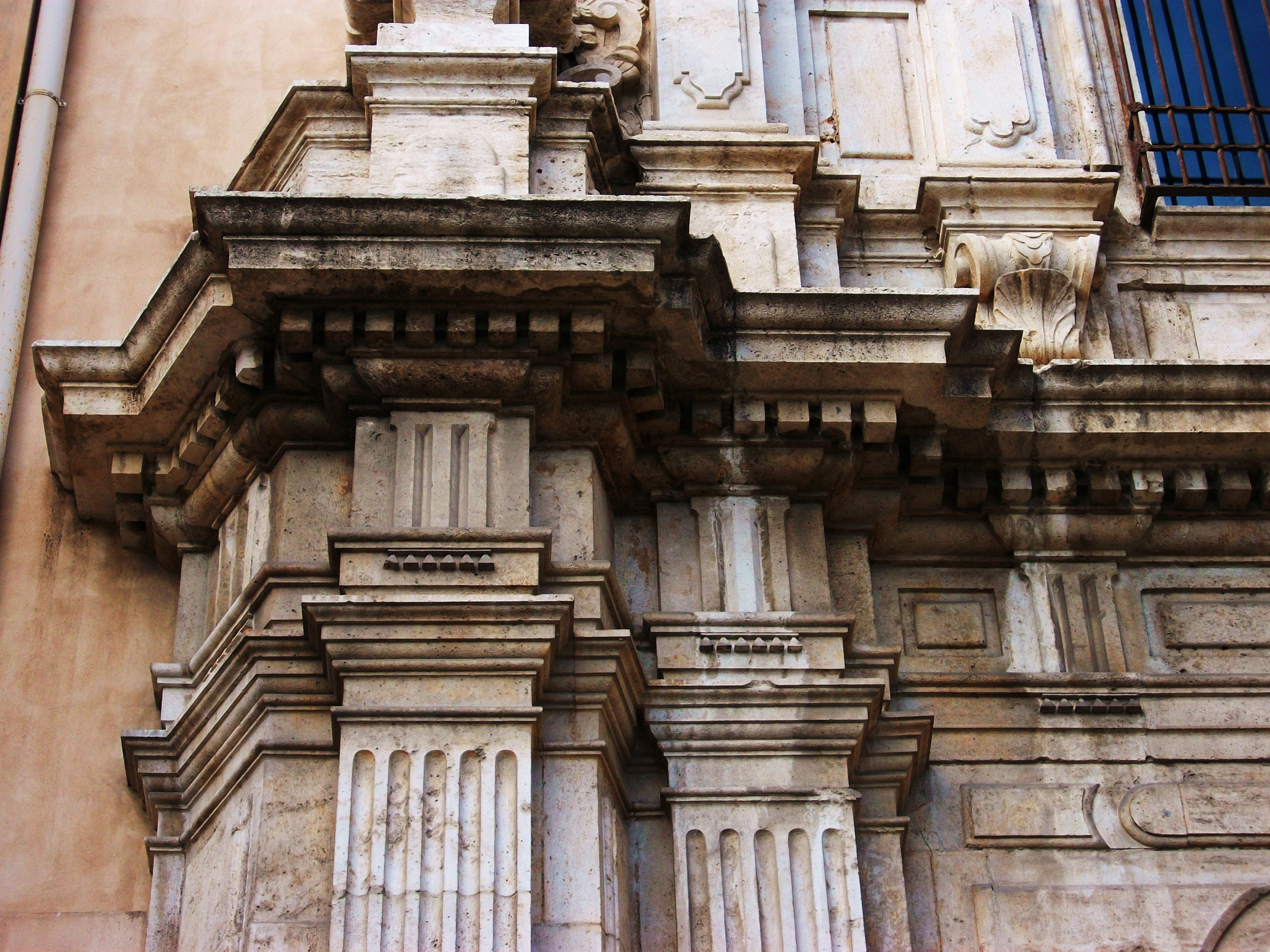
Dentils, triglyphs, and guttae, Museu de Belles Arts de València.

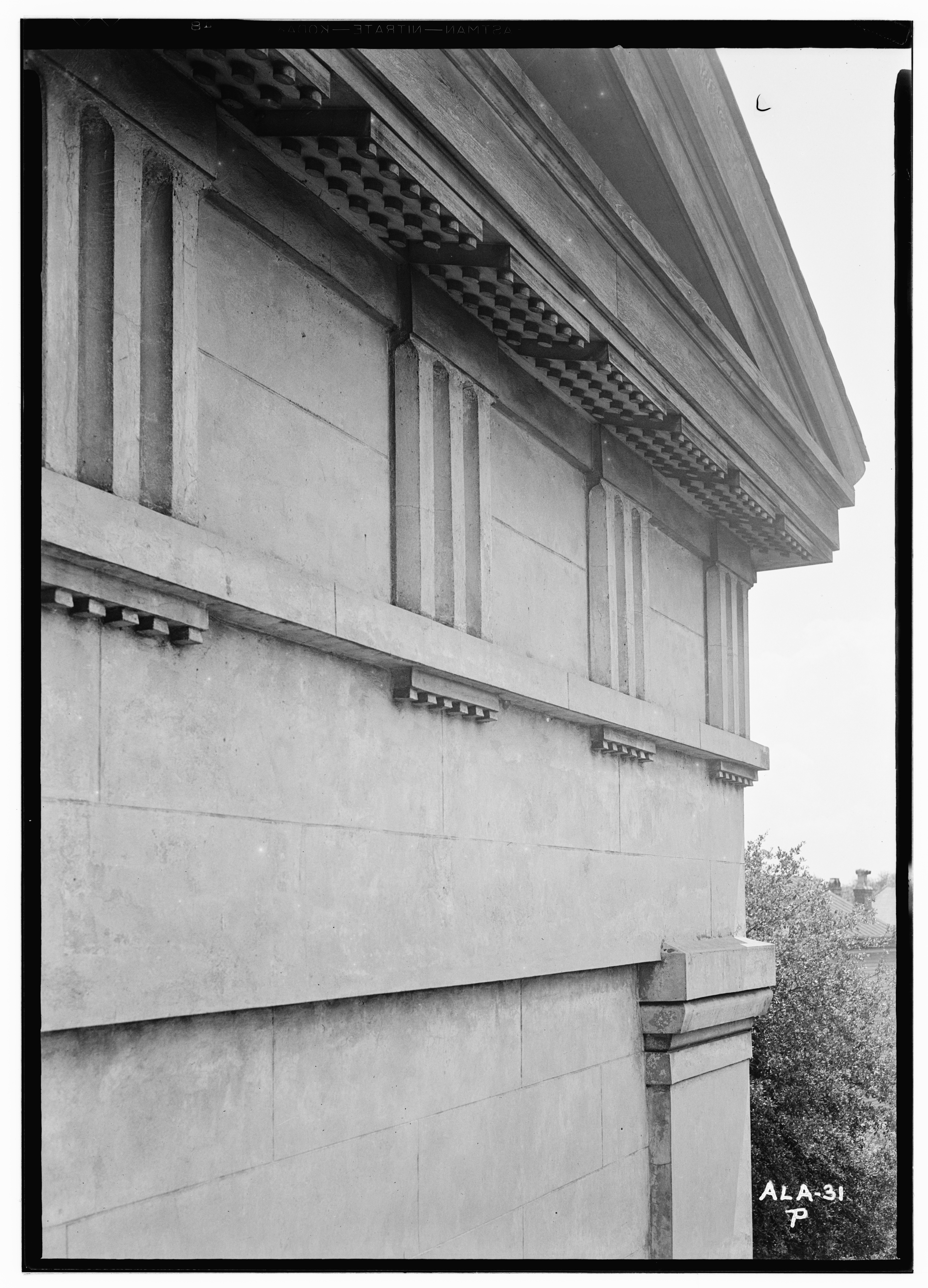
Triglyphs and pilaster cap, Christ Episcopal Church, Mobile, Alabama.

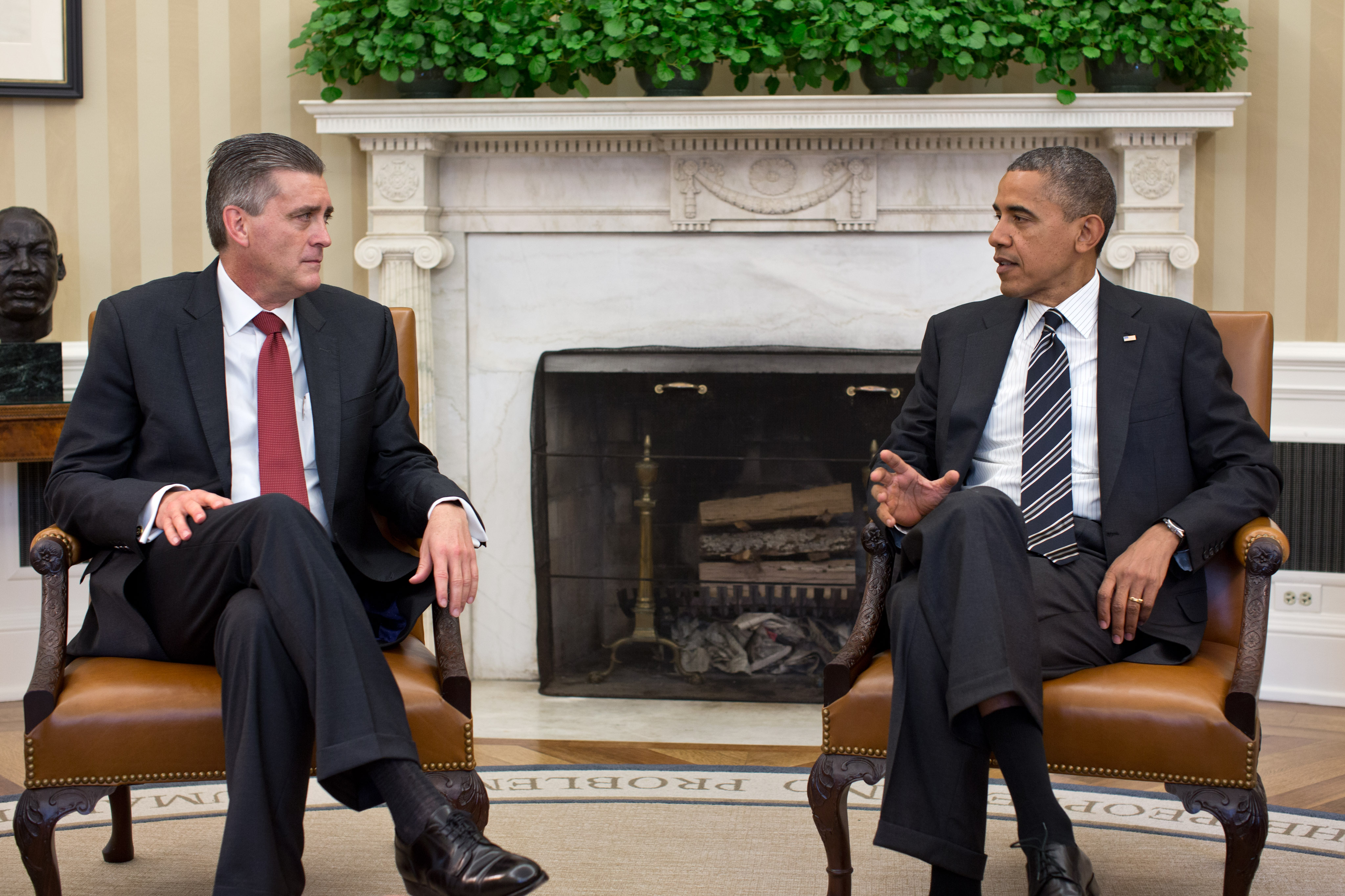
US Ambassador Rick Olson with President Barack Obama, in the Oval Office, with guttae on the Ionic fireplace.
