= Prastara =

Type of entablature in Hindu temple architecture

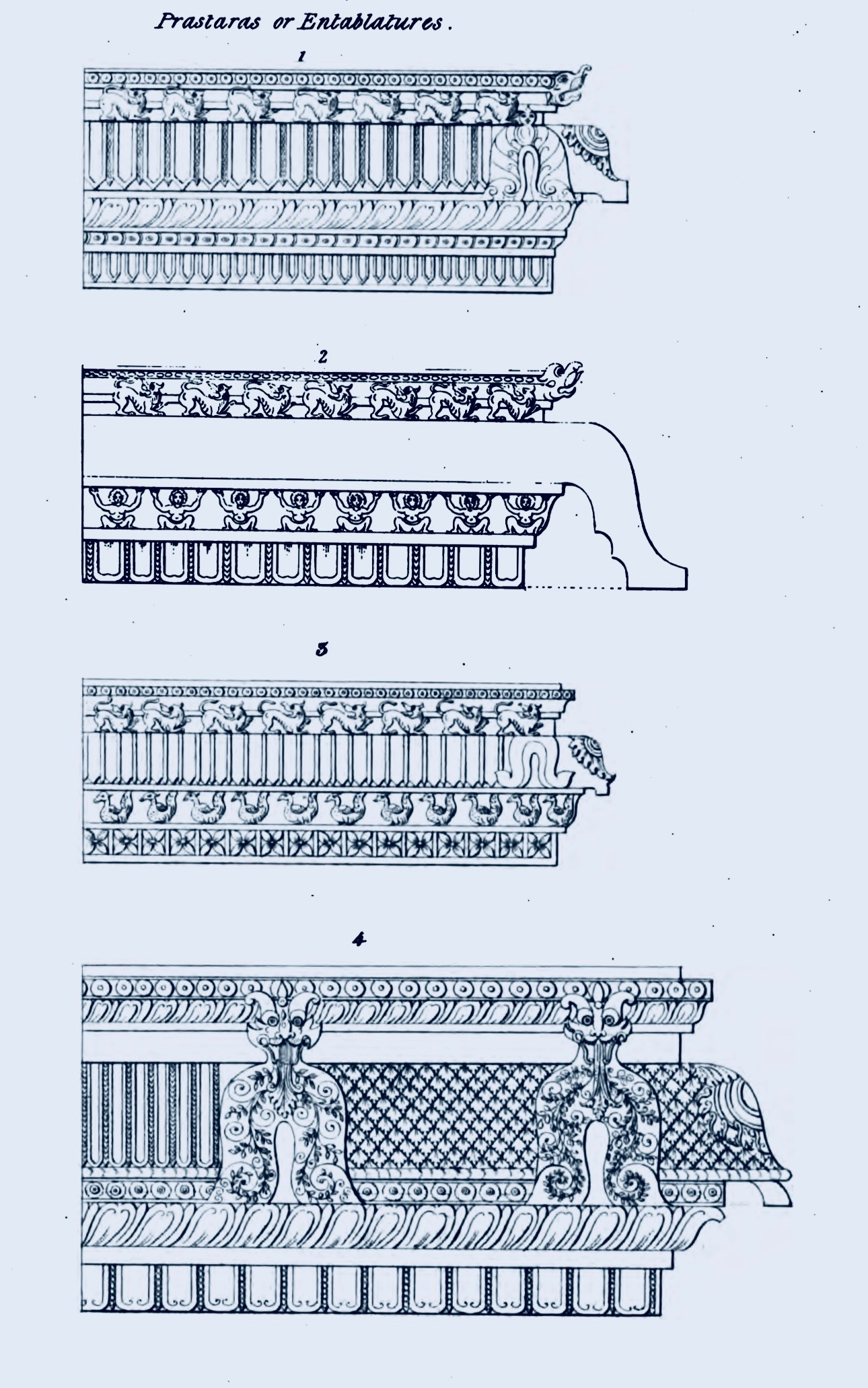
A 1834 sketch of prastaras

Prastara (Sanskrit: प्रस्तर, romanized: prastāra, extension, flat top) is a sort of entablature in Hindu temple architecture.

== Overview ==
It is a horizontal superstructure of bands and moldings above column capitals, sometimes functioning as a parapet of a story. Prastara is both functional and decorative element located above the architrave of the temple. Being the third part of the building counting from the bottom, prastara is a very important element of the overall architectural composition of the temple.

== Meaning ==
In the Dravidian context, prastara signifies a meeting place, where the two divisions of the temple, prasada varga (the Earth) and the pada varga (the Heaven), meet each other.

== Parts ==
Prastara consists of several parts from bottom to top: uttara, valabhi (stringcourse above uttara), and kapota (dripstone). Kapota is usually shaped as a pigeon's head.
