= Entablature =

Architectural element

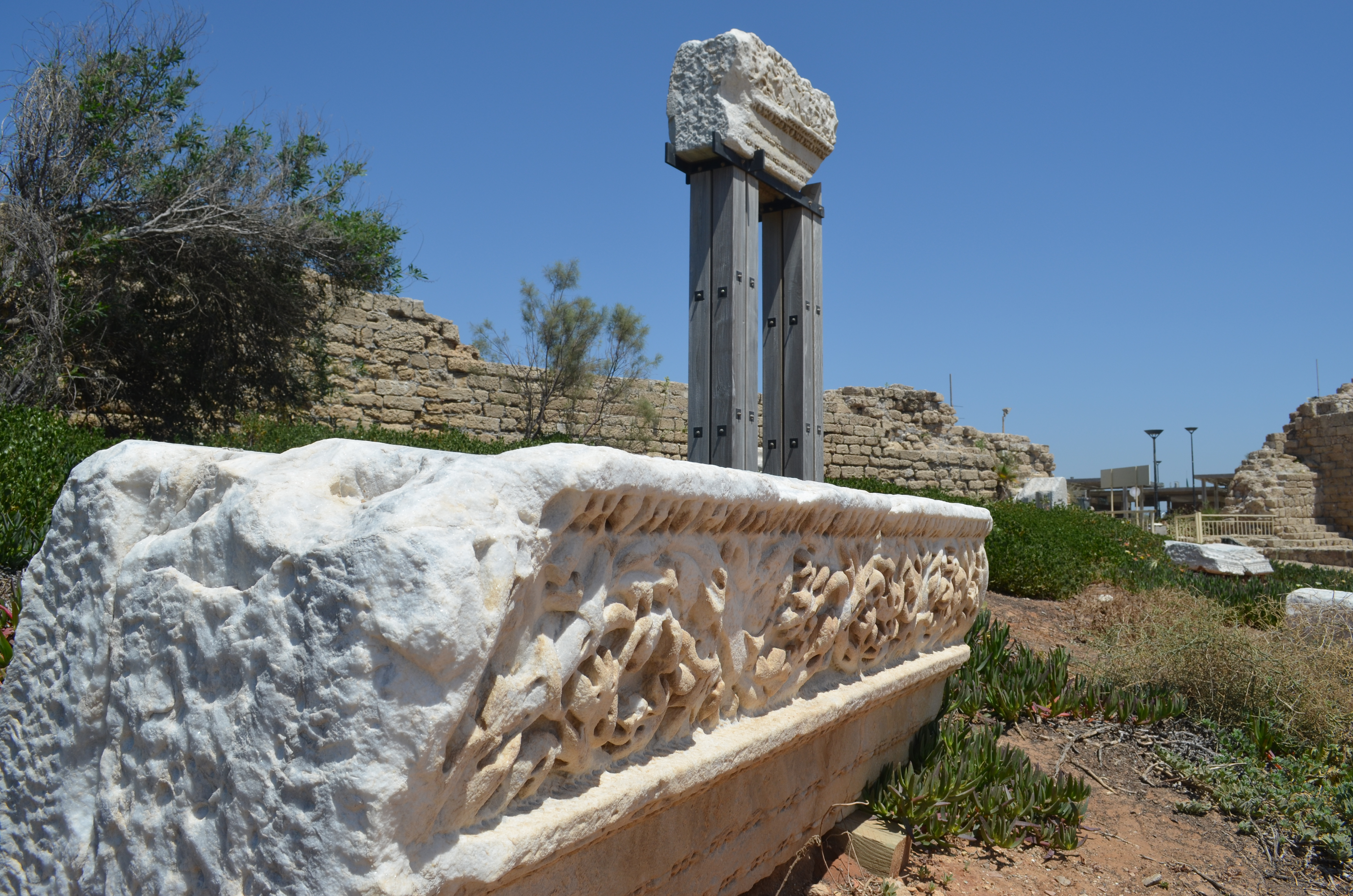
Entablatures at Caesarea Maritima

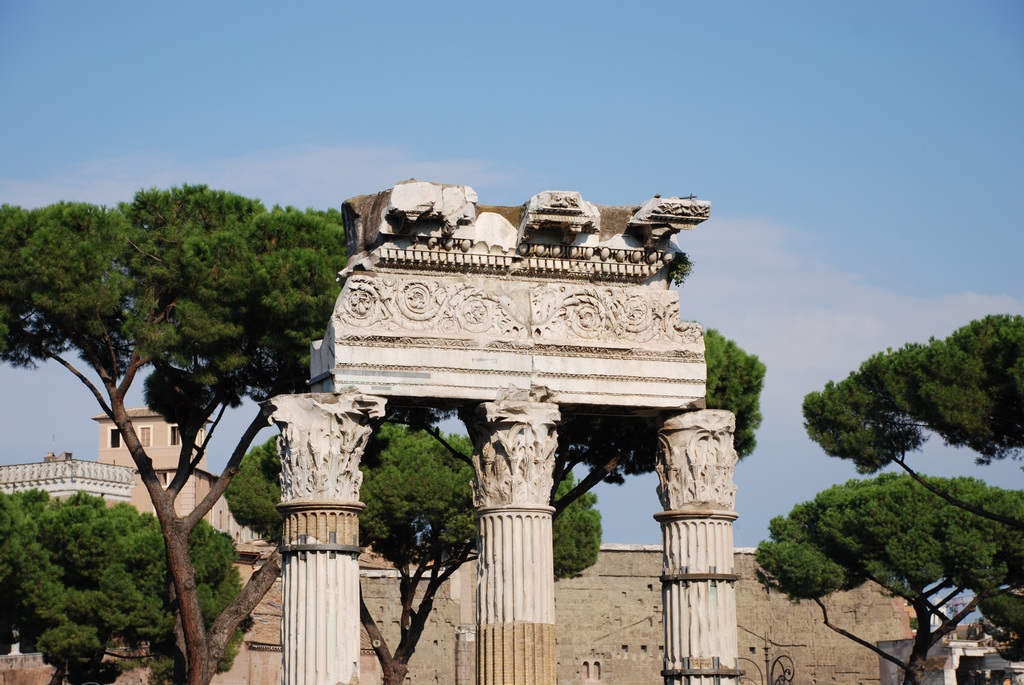
Entablature at the Temple of Venus Genetrix, Rome

An entablature (/ɛnˈtæblətʃər/; nativization of Italian intavolatura, from in "in" and tavola "table") is the superstructure of moldings and bands which lies horizontally above columns, resting on their capitals. Entablatures are major elements of classical architecture, and are commonly divided into the architrave (the supporting member immediately above; equivalent to the lintel in post and lintel construction), the frieze (an unmolded strip that may or may not be ornamented), and the cornice (the projecting member below the pediment). The Greek and Roman temples are believed to be based on wooden structures, the design transition from wooden to stone structures being called petrification.

== Overview ==
The structure of an entablature varies with the orders of architecture. In each order, the proportions of the subdivisions (architrave, frieze, cornice) are defined by the proportions of the column. In Roman and Renaissance interpretations, it is usually approximately a quarter of the height of the column. Variants of entablature that do not fit these models are usually derived from them.

=== Doric ===
In the pure classical Doric order entablature is simple. The architrave, the lowest band, is split, from bottom to top, into the guttae, the regulae, and the taenia.

The frieze is dominated by the triglyphs, vertically channelled tablets, separated by metopes, which may or may not be decorated. The triglyphs sit on top of the taenia, a flat, thin, horizontal protrusion, and are finished at the bottom by decoration (often ornate) of 'drops' called guttae, which belong to the top of the architrave. The top of the triglyphs meet the protrusion of the cornice from the entablature. The underside of this protrusion is decorated with mutules, tablets that are typically finished with guttae.

The cornice is split into the soffit, the corona, and the cymatium. The soffit is simply the exposed underside. The corona and the cymatium are the principal parts of the cornice.

=== Ionic ===
The Ionic order of entablature adds the fascia in the architrave, which are flat horizontal protrusions, and the dentils under the cornice, which are tooth-like rectangular block moldings.

=== Corinthian ===
The Corinthian order adds a far more ornate cornice, divided, from bottom to top, into the cyma reversa, the dentils, the ovolo, the modillions, the fascia, and the cyma recta. The modillions are ornate brackets, similar in use to dentils, but often in the shape of acanthus leaves.

The frieze is sometimes omitted—for example, on the portico of the caryatides of the Erechtheum—and probably did not exist as a structure in the temple of Diana at Ephesus. Neither is it found in the Lycian tombs, which are reproductions in the rock of timber structures based on early Ionian work. The entablature is essentially an evolution of the primitive lintel, which spans two posts, supporting the ends of the roof rafters.

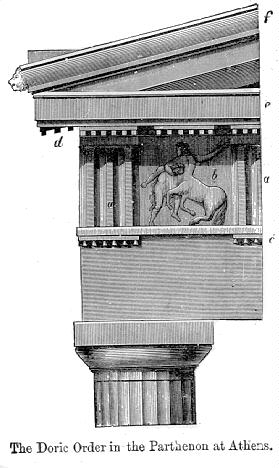
Entablature of the Doric order

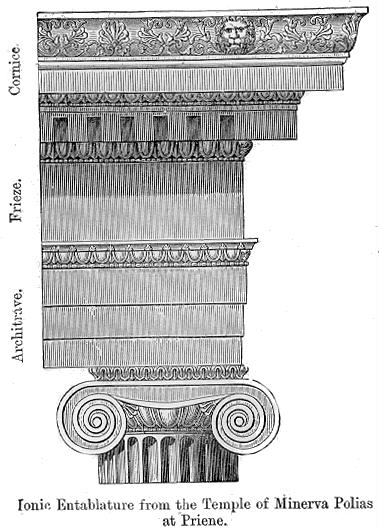
Entablature of the Ionic order

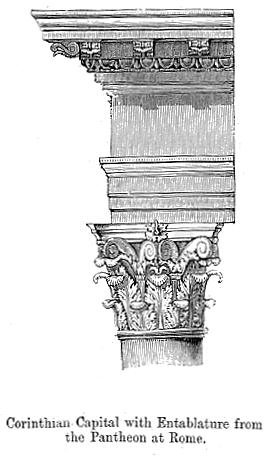
Entablature of the Corinthian order

=== Non-classical architecture ===
The entablature together with the system of classical columns occurs rarely outside classical architecture. It is often used to complete the upper portion of a wall where columns are not present, and in the case of pilasters (flattened columns or projecting from a wall) or detached or engaged columns it is sometimes profiled around them. The use of the entablature, irrespective of columns, appeared after the Renaissance.

== See also ==
- Classical order
- Classical architecture
- Prastara, an entablature in the Hindu temple architecture
