= Architrave =

Lintel beam element in Classical architecture

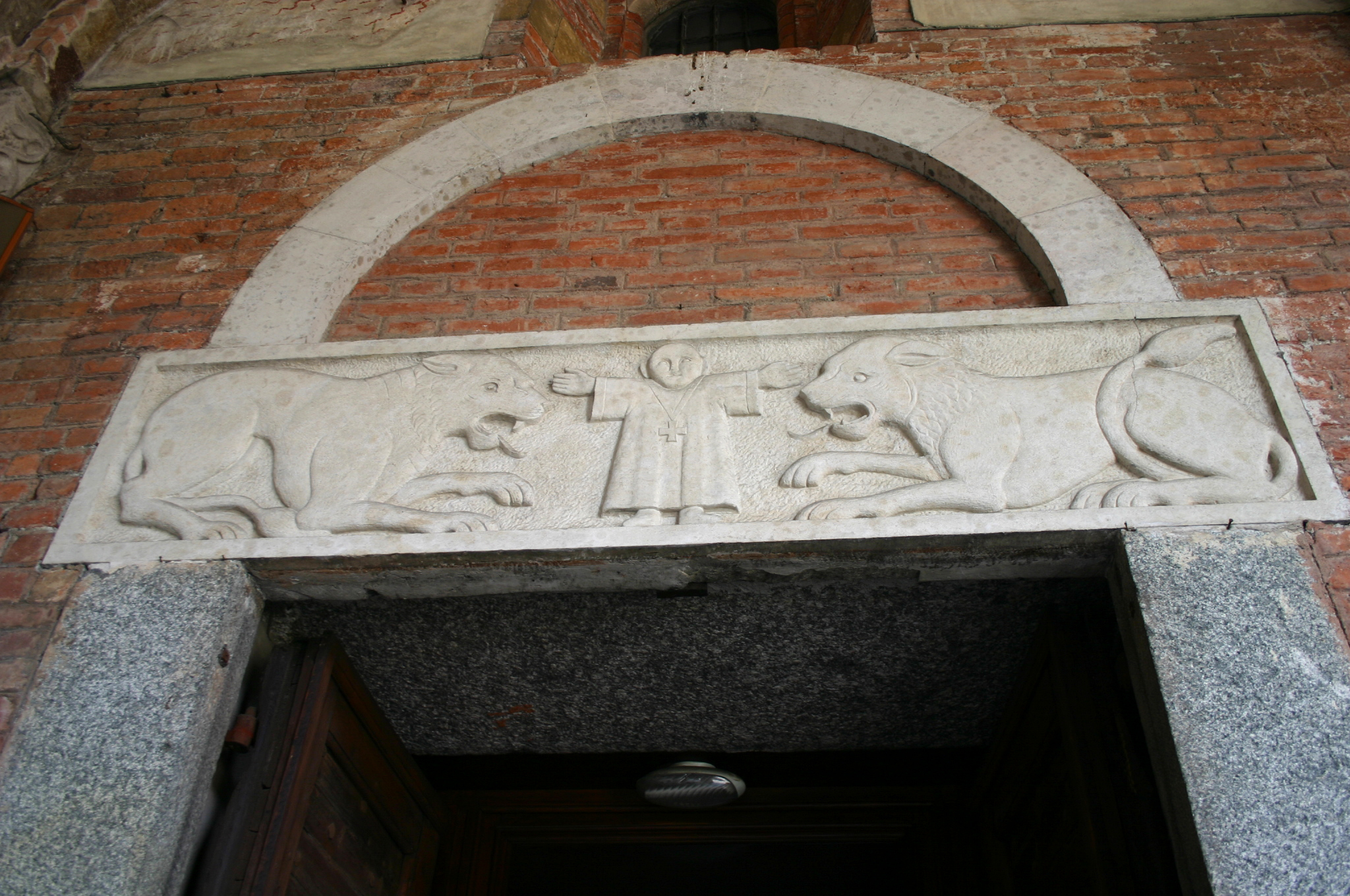
Architrave of the left-side portal in the facade of the Basilica of Sant'Ambrogio in Milan, Italy (with a relieving arch above)

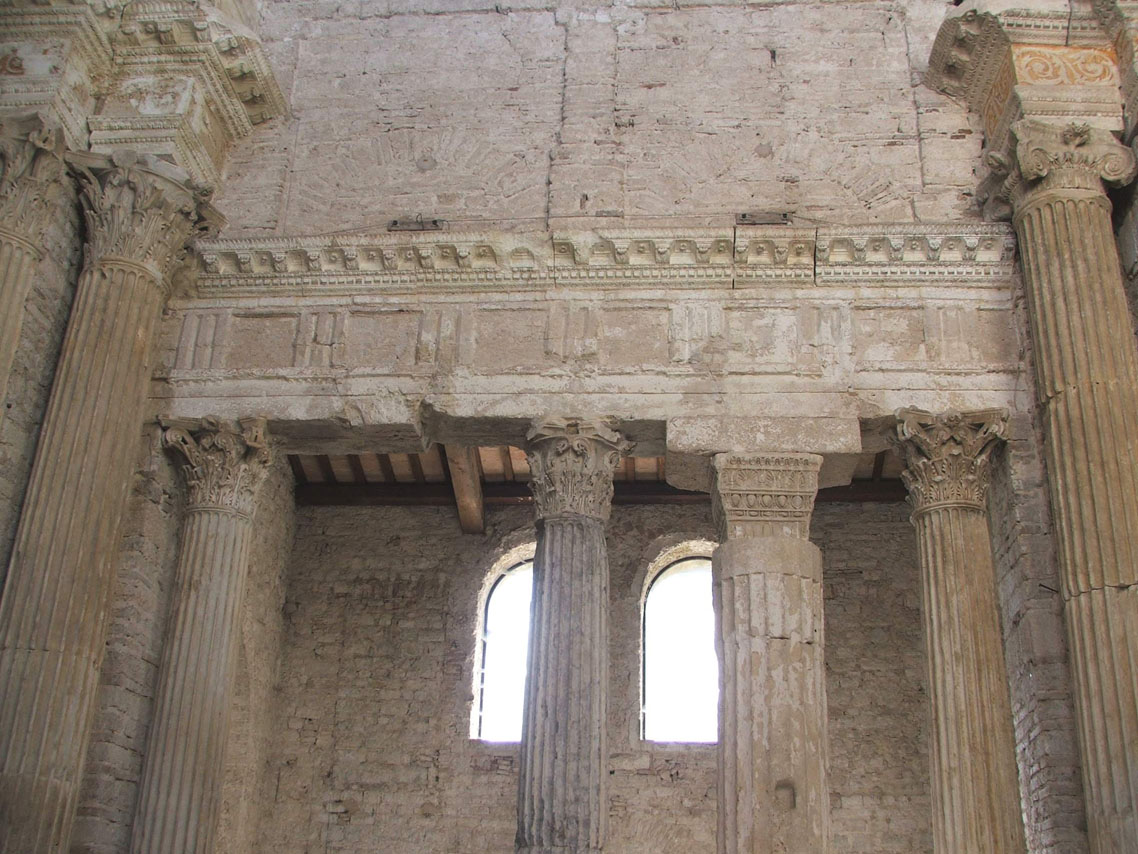
Architrave in the Basilica of San Salvatore, Spoleto, Italy. Two relieving arches are faintly visible.

In classical architecture, an architrave (/ˈɑːrkɪˌtreɪv/; from Italian architrave 'chief beam'), also called an epistyle (from Ancient Greek ἐπίστυλον (epístulon) 'on the column'), is the lintel or beam, typically made of wood or stone, that rests on the capitals of columns.

The term can also apply to all sides, including the vertical members, of a frame with mouldings around a door or window, and has come to be used to refer more generally to a style of mouldings (or other elements) framing a door, window or other rectangular opening, where the horizontal "head" casing extends across the tops of the vertical side casings where the elements join (forming a butt joint, as opposed to a miter joint).

== Classical architecture ==
In an entablature in classical architecture, it is the lowest part, below the frieze and cornice. The word is derived from the Greek and Latin words arche and trabs combined to mean "main beam". The architrave is different in the different Classical orders. In the Tuscan order, it only consists of a plain face, crowned with a fillet, and is half a module in height. In the Doric and Composite order, it has two faces, or fasciae, and it has three in the Ionic and Corinthian order, in which it is 10/12 of a module high, though but half a module in the rest.

== Metaphorical use ==
The term architrave has also been used in academic writing to mean the fundamental part of something (a speech, a thought or a reasoning), or the basis upon which an idea, reasoning, thought or philosophy is built.

Examples:

1. "...the Mature Hegel – the Hegel of the Philosophy of Right – who becomes the architrave on which he (Honneth, ed.) constructs his social philosophy."
2. "to become the architrave of his theoretic construction"

== Modern architraves ==
In modern architecture and interior design, the term architrave also refers to the mouldings that frame doors and windows. Unlike classical architraves, which were primarily structural and often ornate, modern architraves are typically decorative and functional, concealing the gap between the wall and the door or window frame.

=== Materials ===
Modern architraves are commonly made from:

- MDF (Medium-Density Fibreboard): A popular choice due to its affordability, smooth surface, and ease of painting.
- Wood: A traditional material often used for premium finishes, including oak, pine, and other hardwoods.
- PVC or uPVC: Commonly used in areas prone to moisture, such as bathrooms, due to its durability and resistance to warping.

=== Styles ===
Modern architraves are available in a variety of styles to suit different interior design preferences:

- Simple Flat Profiles: Minimalist designs for modern and contemporary interiors.
- Ogee and Torus Profiles: Decorative mouldings used in more traditional or classic interiors.
- Custom Profiles: Bespoke designs created to match specific architectural or design requirements.

=== Function ===
Modern architraves serve both aesthetic and practical purposes:

1. Concealing gaps between the wall and the frame of a door or window.
2. Protecting edges from damage.
3. Enhancing the overall aesthetic of an interior space.

Modern architraves are typically installed after the walls have been finished (plastered and painted) but before flooring is laid. They are often painted or finished to match or complement the doors and walls they surround.

== Indian architecture ==
In śilpaśāstra, the Hindu texts on architecture, the architrave is commonly referred to by its Sanskrit name uttara. In Hindu temple architecture it is placed above the bracket (potika) of a pillar (stambha), which gives it extra support. The Indian entablature is called prastara.

Dravidian architecture recognizes several distinct types of architraves:

- rounded (vṛttapotika)
- wavy (taraṅgapotika)
- flower shaped (puṣpapotika)
- bevel and tenon type (ādhārapotika)
- voluted (muṣṭibanda)
- figural (citrapotika)

== See also ==
- Archivolt – expanded and elaborated architrave element
- Dolmen – Neolithic predecessor, megalithic tombs with structural stone lintels
- Lintel
- Post and lintel – architectural system with architraves-lintels

== Sources ==
- Ahmed, Arshad; Sturges, John (2014-11-20). Materials Science In Construction: An Introduction. Routledge. ISBN 978-1-135-13840-0.
- Darbyshire, A. (2010). Mechanical Engineering. CRC Press. ISBN 978-1-136-43699-4.
- Ellis, G. (1902). Modern Practical Joinery. B. T. Batsford.
