= Erythromycin 12 hydroxylase =

Enzyme

Identifiers
- EC no.: 1.14.13.154

Databases
- IntEnz: IntEnz view
- BRENDA: BRENDA entry
- ExPASy: NiceZyme view
- KEGG: KEGG entry
- MetaCyc: metabolic pathway
- PRIAM: profile
- PDB structures: RCSB PDB PDBe PDBsum
Search
- PMC: articles
- PubMed: articles
- NCBI: proteins

Erythromycin 12 hydroxylase (EC 1.14.13.154, EryK) is an enzyme with systematic name erythromycin-D,NADPH:oxygen oxidoreductase (12-hydroxylating) . This enzyme catalyses the following chemical reaction

erythromycin D
+ NADPH
+ H^{+}
O_{2}
H_{2}O
erythromycin C
+ NADP^{+}

The enzyme characterised from Saccharopolyspora erythraea converts erythromycin D into erythromycin C by introduction of a hydroxy group at the C-12 position of the macrocycle. It uses reduced nicotinamide adenine dinucleotide phosphate (NADPH) and oxygen as cofactors. Erythromycin C is subsequently converted to the antibiotic, erythromycin A, by the enzyme erythromycin 3''-O-methyltransferase.
