= S. erythraea =

S. erythraea may refer to:

- Saccharopolyspora erythraea, a bacterium species
- Sporocladopsis erythraea, an alga species in the genus Sporocladopsis

== Synonyms ==
- Sillago erythraea, a synonym for Sillago sihama, a fish species

== See also ==
- Erythraea (disambiguation)
- S. erythraeae (disambiguation)
