= Aristomache of Erythrae =

Purported Greek poet

- Ἀριστομάχη
- Occupation: Poet
- Writing career
- Years active: 2nd century BC

Aristomache (Ancient Greek: Ἀριστομάχη) of Erythrae (Note: There were several cities called Erythrae in the ancient Greek world; it is unclear which Aristomache came from.) was an ancient Greek poet known only from a report by Polemon of Ilium, quoted by Plutarch in his Table Talk. According to this report, Aristomache won the contest for epic poetry at the Isthmian Games twice, and subsequently dedicated a golden book or tablet in the Sicyonian Treasury at Delphi. It is uncertain whether Aristomache was a real historical figure. If she was, her dates are unknown, though she must have been active before Polemon, writing in the early 2nd century BCE. None of her poetry survives.
