= Sicyonian Treasury =

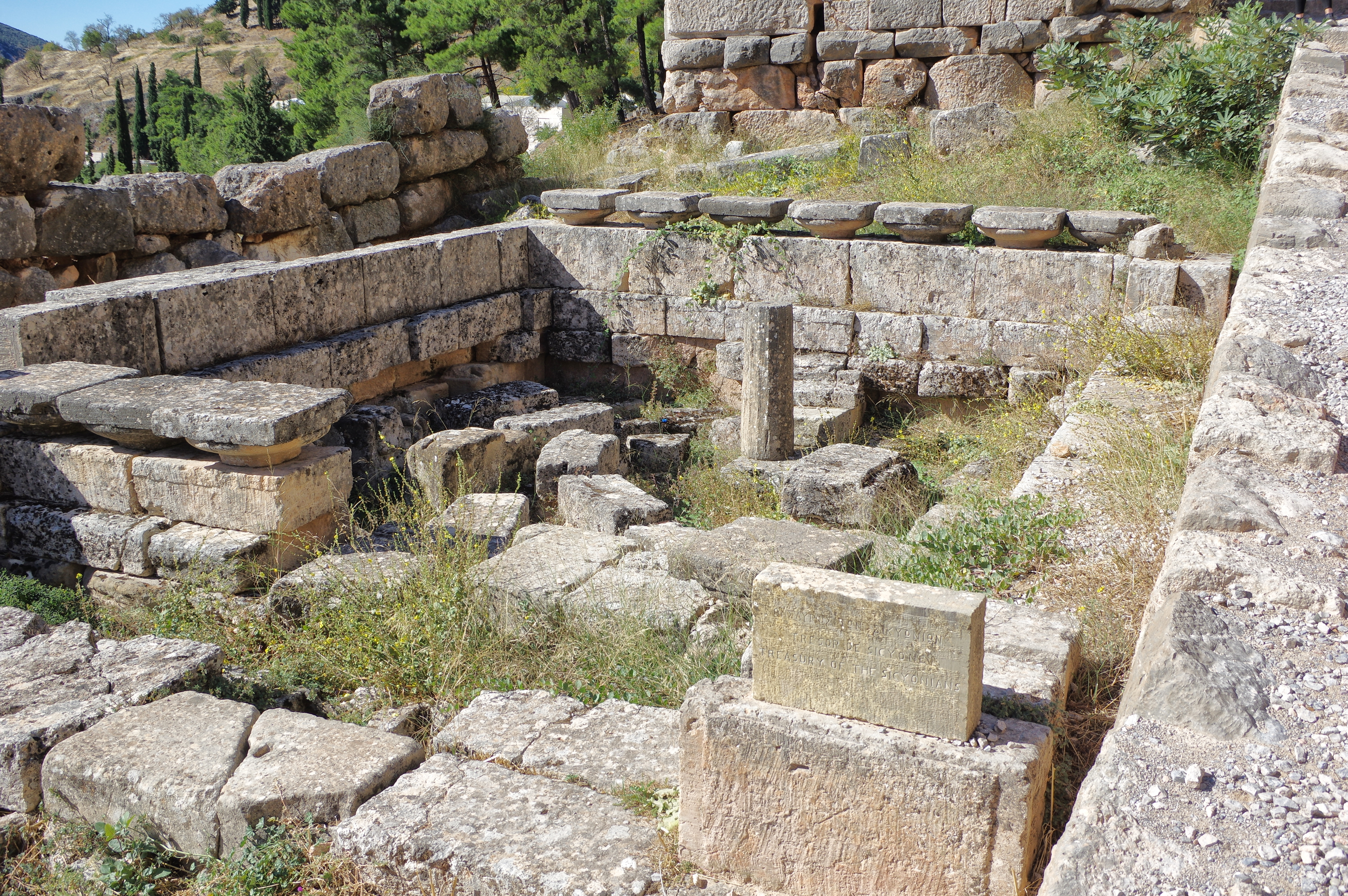
Treasury of the Sicyonians

The Treasury of the Sicyonians is one of the buildings within the sanctuary of Apollo in Delphi. It has a long and complicated history. The treasury itself replaced two former buildings, namely the tholos and the monopteros, built by the same city at an earlier stage within the 6th century. The earlier buildings were related to the Orthagorids of Sicyon and particularly to the victories of the tyrant Cleisthenes of Sicyon in the course of the First Sacred War and their replacement probably marks the change in tide in Sicyonian politics.

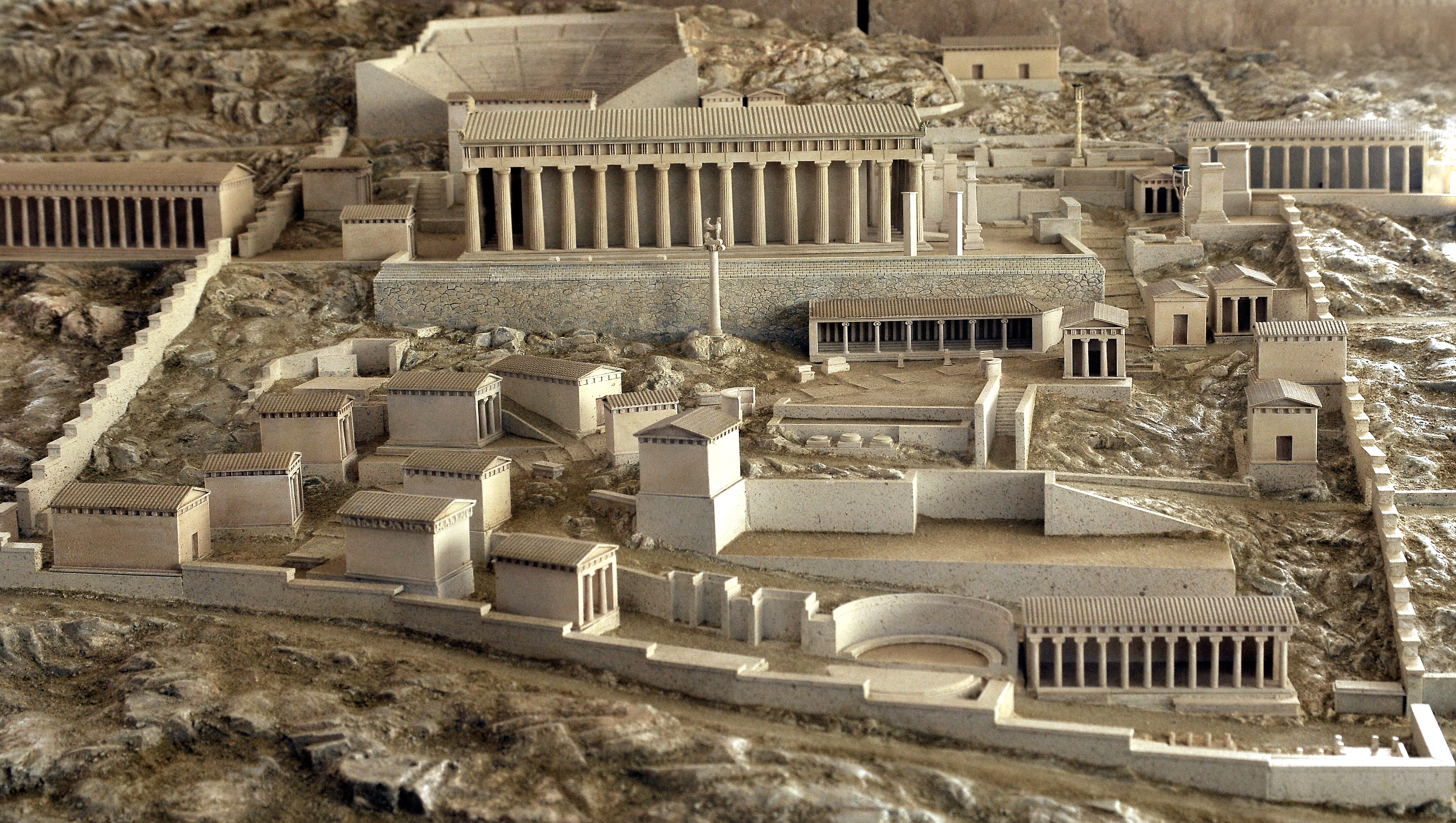
In the museum's model, front centre, with columns visible

== Description ==
The Sicyonian Treasury is in fact a generic name, signifying three different buildings of the 6th century BC.

=== The Tholos ===
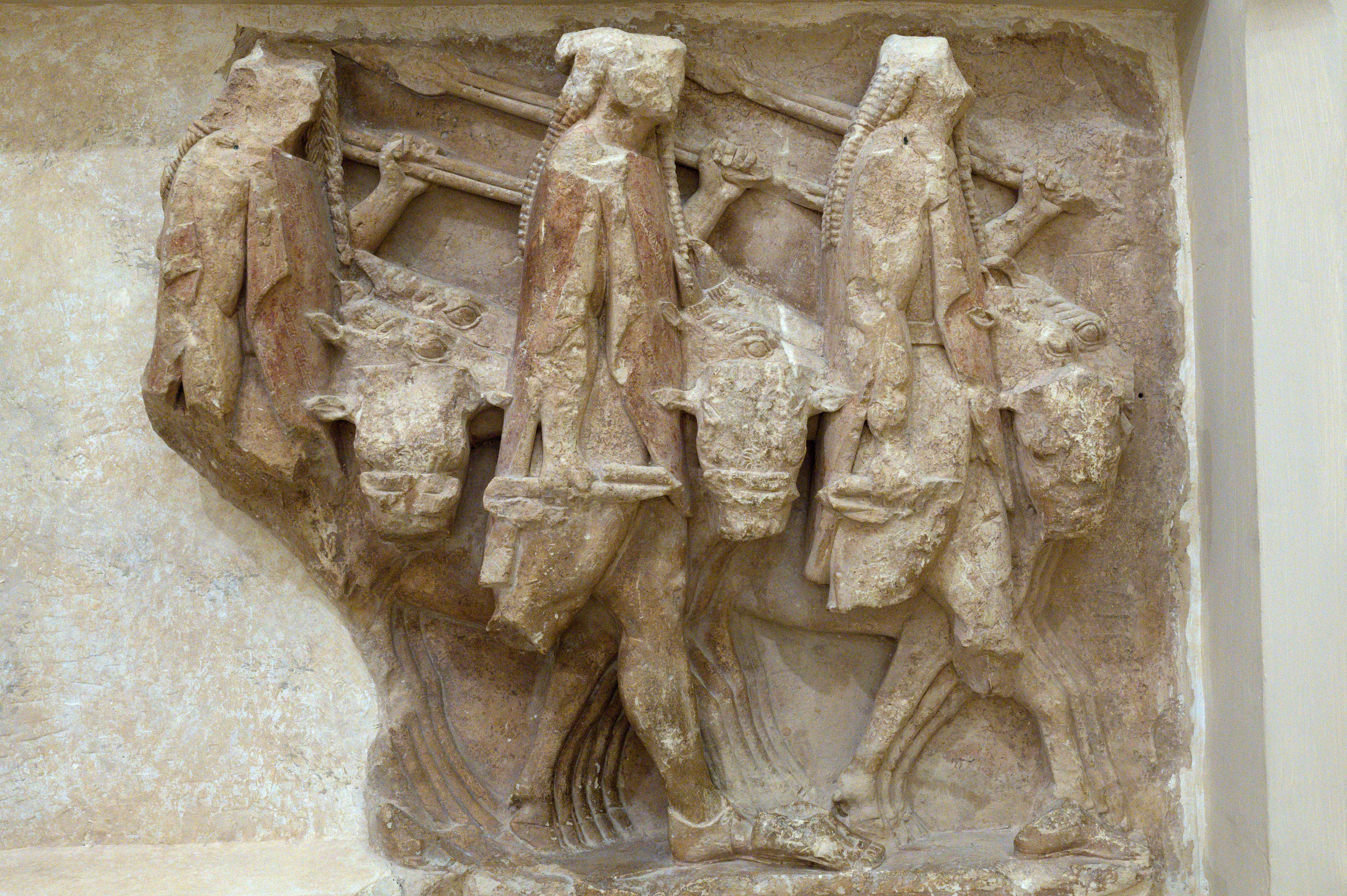
Castor and Pollux on their cattle raid, archaic relief, AM of Delphi

The Tholos of the Sicyonians was probably the oldest construction, dating to ca 580 BC, and built right after the First Sacred War at the instigation of the tyrant of Sicyon Cleisthenes, who was the most prominent leader in that war. It measured 6.3 meters at the base and 3.54 meters at the floor level and was surrounded by a colonnade consisting of 13 Doric columns and a Doric architrave. The cella was circular, made of ashlar masonry with a single door. The height of the walls was 4.04 meters. The shape of its roof is conjectural as nothing has been preserved.

=== The Monopteros ===
The Monopteros of the Sicyonians, as signified by its name, was a relatively small building (4×5 meters) with a single row of 14 columns (pteron). The columns were monolithic, i.e. they consisted of single blocks of limestone, and measured 2.78 meters in height; they supported the roof directly, without any intervening walls. The architrave was decorated with a frieze with scenes in relief, inspired by heroic themes. The discovery of these sculptures buried under the Treasury of the late sixth century helped scholars date the monopteros to ca. 560 BC. The building looked more like a shelter and thus it led to the conjecture that it hosted a precious and fragile ex-voto, possibly the chariot with which Cleisthenes won at the first Pythian Games of 582 BC.

The sculptures of the metopes of the monopteros constitute excellent specimens of archaic reliefs. They are inspired by mythology: the journey of Phrixus and Helle, the Argonauts' expedition, the abduction of Europa by Zeus, the Dioskouroi, the hunt of the Calydonian boar. The metopes were painted over in bright colours, creating a strong decorative impression.

=== The Treasury ===
The actual treasury was built in the Doric order and was distyle in antis, with vestibule and cella. It measured 8.27×6.24 meters and lay on a foundation made of porous stone quarried in Corinthia. Its orientation was the same as that of the Siphnian Treasury to which it was probably contemporary (ca. 525 BC). The monument was visible from the entrance to the sanctuary. Historians believe that it was constructed by the demos of Sicyon when the Orthagorids were forced to demise, in order to mark the change in Sicyonian politics. Despite the fact that the two former buildings were deliberately destroyed, their architectural members were not dispersed or reused, but rather buried under the foundations of the Treasury.

== See also ==
- Athenian Treasury
- Boeotian Treasury
- Cnidian Treasury
- Theban Treasury

== Bibliography ==
- Bommelaer, J.-F., Laroche, D., 1991, Guide de Delphes. Le site, pp. 119–122.
- Nenna, M.-D., Laroche, D., 1990,"Le trésor de Sicyone et ses fondations", BCH 114, pp. 241–284
