= Cytochrome P450 eryF =

Enzyme

Identifiers
- Organism: Saccharopolyspora erythraea
- Symbol: eryF
- Alt. symbols: CYP107A1
- Orthologs: OMA: entry
- UniProt: Q00441

Other data
- EC number: 1.14.15.35
Search for
- Structures: Swiss-model
- Domains: InterPro

6-deoxyerythronolide B hydroxylase is an Actinomycetota Cytochrome P450 enzyme originally from Saccharopolyspora erythraea, catalyzes the 6S-hydroxylate of 6-deoxyerythronolide B (6-DEB) to erythronolide B (EB) which is the first step of biosynthesis of the macrolide antibiotic erythromycin. This bacterial enzyme belongs to CYP family CYP107, with the CYP Symbol CYP107A1.
