= CYP107 family =

Family of cytochrome P450 enzymes

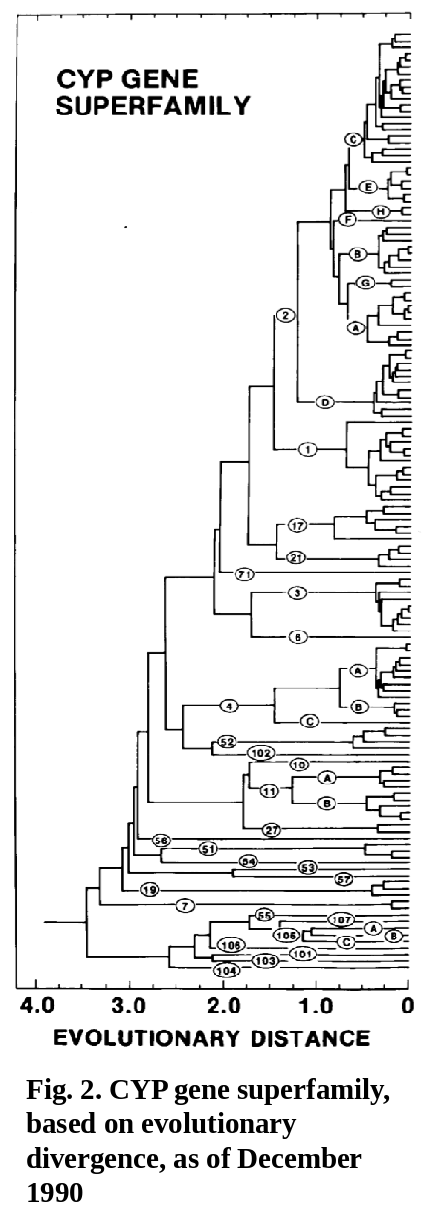
The evolutionary divergence of the CYP superfamily collected in 1990, CYP107 is the seventh prokaryotic CYP family identified

Cytochrome P450, family 107, also known as CYP107, is a cytochrome P450 monooxygenase family in bacteria, found to be conserved and highly populated in Streptomyces and Bacillus species. The first gene identified in this family is Cytochrome P450 eryF (CYP107A1) from Saccharopolyspora erythraea. Many enzymes of this family are involved in the synthesis of macrolide antibiotics. The members of this family are widely distributed in Alphaproteobacteria, cyanobacterial, Mycobacterium, Bacillota, and Streptomyces species, which may be due to horizontal gene transfer driven by selection pressure.
