= Desosaminyl transferase EryCIII =

Enzyme

Identifiers
- EC no.: 2.4.1.278

Databases
- IntEnz: IntEnz view
- BRENDA: BRENDA entry
- ExPASy: NiceZyme view
- KEGG: KEGG entry
- MetaCyc: metabolic pathway
- PRIAM: profile
- PDB structures: RCSB PDB PDBe PDBsum
Search
- PMC: articles
- PubMed: articles
- NCBI: proteins

Desosaminyl transferase EryCIII (EC 2.4.1.278, EryCIII) is an enzyme with systematic name dTDP-3-dimethylamino-4,6-dideoxy-alpha-D-glucopyranose:3-alpha-mycarosylerythronolide B 3-dimethylamino-4,6-dideoxy-alpha-D-glucosyltransferase. This enzyme catalyses the following chemical reaction

dTDP-3-dimethylamino-4,6-dideoxy-alpha-D-glucopyranose + 3-alpha-mycarosylerythronolide B $\rightleftharpoons$ dTDP + erythromycin D

The enzyme is involved in erythromycin biosynthesis.
