= Abelardo Aguilar =

Filipino scientist

Abelardo B. Aguilar
- Born: November 3, 1917; Manila, Philippine Islands
- Died: September 22, 1993 (aged 75)
- Occupation: Physician
- Known for: Discovery of erythromycin

Abelardo B. Aguilar (November 3, 1917 – September 22, 1993) was a Filipino doctor from Iloilo, Philippines who worked as a medical representative for Eli Lilly and Company.

== Discovery of erythromycin ==
In 1949, Aguilar was testing soil samples from his backyard and had discovered a method to formulate erythromycin.

Saccharopolyspora erythraea, a strain of bacteria was isolated and lead to his discovery and to the development of Erythromycin, an antibiotic used today. Aguilar discovered a method to formulate Erythromycin while testing soil samples from his backyard

Dr. Abelardo Aguilar isolated a strain of bacteria which lead to the development of erythromycin, a broad-spectrum antibiotic used to treat and prevent a wide range of infections.

Eli Lilly and Company marketed erythromycin under the brand name Ilosone. Aguilar received no credit or compensation for his discovery.
