= Cape Goudouras =

Headland at the southeast of Crete

Coordinates: 34°59′44″N 26°05′47″E

Cape Goudouras (Greek: Άκρα Γούδουρα, romanized: Akra Goudoura), anciently known as Erythraeum promontorium (Ancient Greek: Ἐρυθραῖον ἄκρον, romanized: Erythraion akron), is a headland at the southeast of Crete. The ancient town of Erythraea is nearby.
