= Siphnian Treasury =

Building once in Delphi, Greece

Coordinates: 38.4816°N 22.5014°E

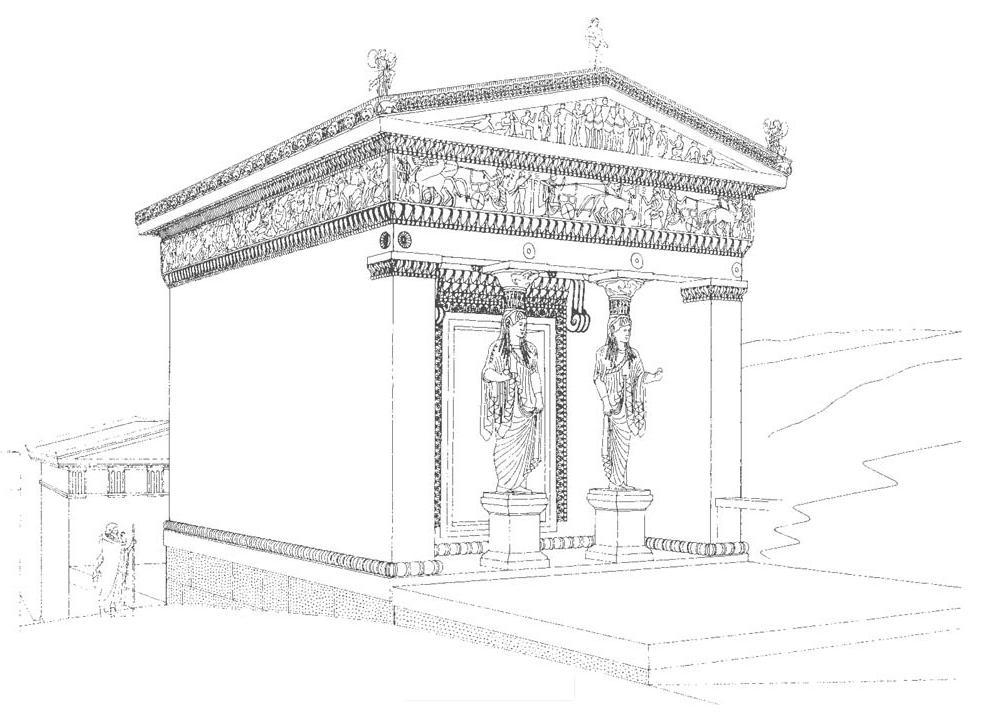
- Reconstruction of the Siphnian Treasury by Theophil Hansen
- Interactive map of the Siphnian Treasury area

General information
- Type: Treasury
- Architectural style: Ionic
- Location: Delphi, Greece
- Owner: Delphi Archaeological Museum

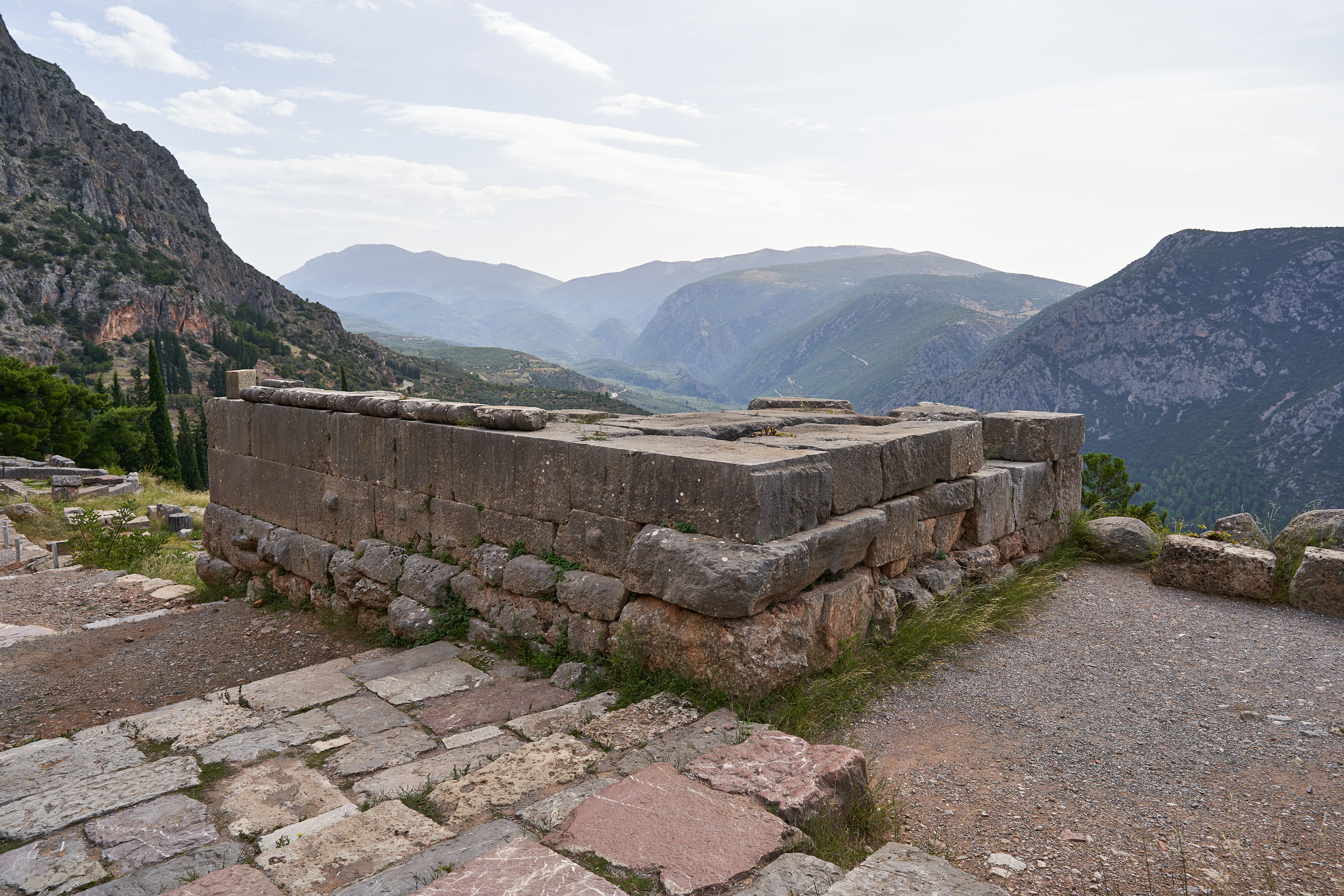
Sideview of the foundation at the Sanctuary of Apollo

The Siphnian Treasury was a building at the Ancient Greek cult center of Delphi, erected to host the offerings of the polis, or city-state, of Siphnos. It was one of many treasuries lining the "Sacred Way", the processional route through the Sanctuary of Apollo, erected to win the favor of the gods and increase the prestige of the donor polis. It was one of the earliest surviving buildings of this type, and its date remains a matter of debate, with the most plausible date around 525 BC. Until recently, it was often confused or conflated with the neighboring Cnidian Treasury, a similar but less elaborate building, as the remains of the two had become mixed and earlier theoretical reconstructions used parts of both.

The people of Siphnos had gained enormous wealth from their silver and gold mines in the Archaic period (Herodotus III.57) and used the tithe of their income to erect the treasury, the first religious structure made entirely out of marble. The building was used to house many lavish votive offerings given to the priests for presentation to Apollo.

The Treasury fell to ruins over the centuries, although it stood for much longer than many other monuments, probably due to its decoration which was venerated by the following generations. Currently, the sculpture and a reconstruction of the Treasury are able to be seen in the Delphi Archaeological Museum.

The treasury is important in that it shows a transition from the styles of Archaic Greek art to the beginning of the styles of Classical Greek art. If the dating is correct, then the treasury would have been made between the end of the Archaic period and the beginning of the Classical period. The stiffness and lack of movement of the figures at the east pediment, common features of Archaic art, are then slowly changed at the friezes to make the figures more fluid and dynamic.

== Dating of founding ==
The only classical source to provide information on this building is Herodotus (3:57-8). If Herodotus is to be deemed a reliable source, this would be sufficient for verifying the date. In his account, Herodotus states that the Siphnians had recently founded a temple at Delphi when a group of Samians arrived asking for support against the tyrannical Polycrates. In respect to this, both Herodotus and Thucydides state that Polycrates ruled during the reign of the Persian king Cambyses II (c. 530–522 BC). This would thus date the monument at about 525 BC. One source considers the date of construction as more likely some time absolutely limited to after 480 BC (Whitley).

== Description ==
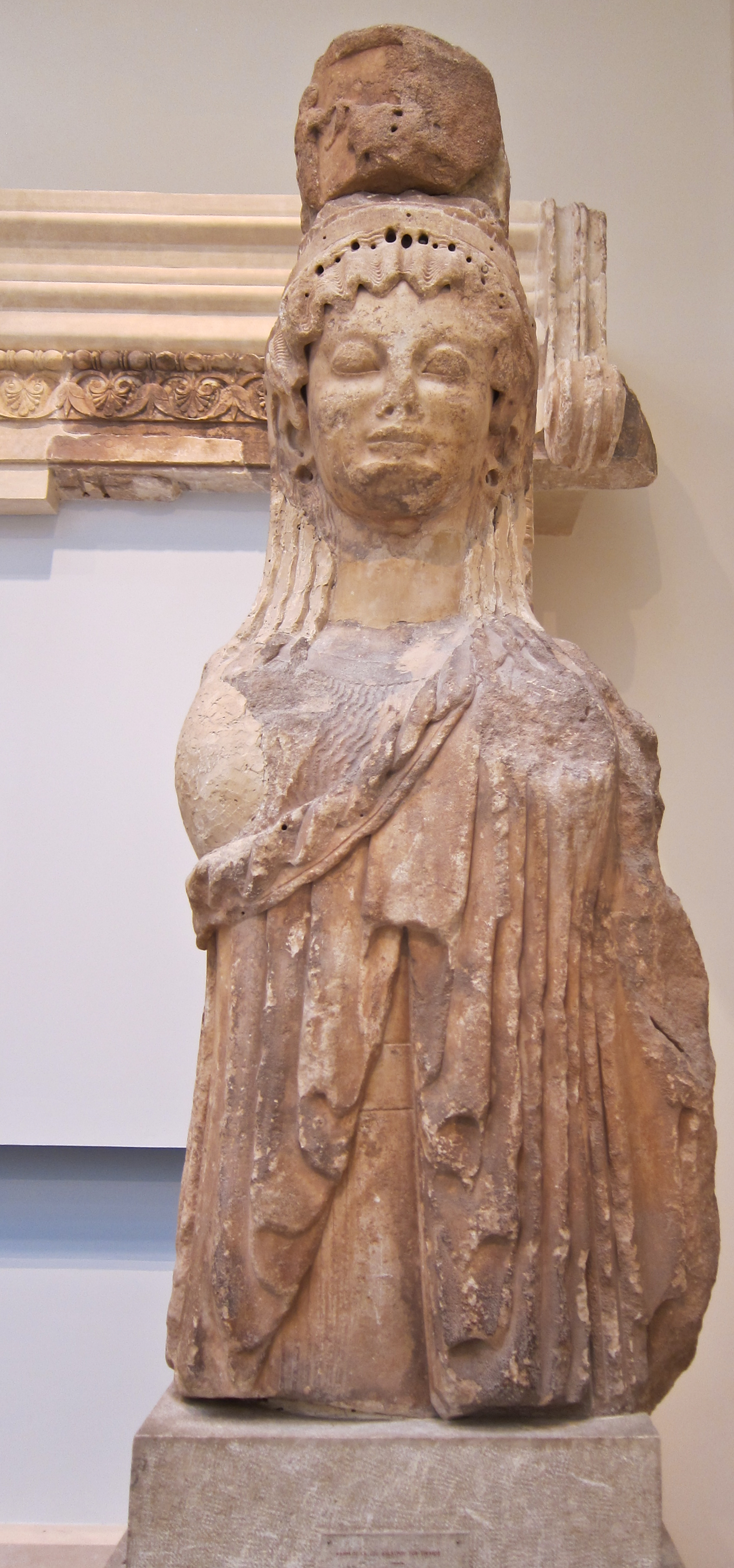
Upper torso of one of the Caryatids

The plan of the treasury has two parts: a pronaos, or porch, and a cella, or enclosure. The pronaos is distyle in antis, i.e., the side walls (Latin antae) extend to the front of the porch, and the pediment is supported by two caryatids instead of plain columns. Below the pediment runs a continuous frieze. The building is 8.27 metres long and 6.09 wide.

The east pediment of the treasury shows the story of Heracles stealing Apollo's tripod, which was strongly associated with his oracular inspiration. The treasury was also one of the first Greek buildings to utilize falling and reclining figures to fill the corners of the pediment.

The east frieze first depicts the assembly of the Twelve Olympians about the Trojan War. In the lost center of the assembly, Hermes would have held scales while weighing the souls (psychostasia) of Achilles and Memnon. To the left are seated the gods who side with the Trojans, and on the right are the gods who side with the Greeks. Then the frieze depicts a scene from the Iliad where Achilles and Memnon fight over the body of dead Antilochus.

The north frieze depicts the Gigantomachy.

The west frieze may show the story of the Judgment of Paris, the death of Orion, or Athena translating Heracles to the ME.

The south frieze is the hardest to pinpoint, due to most of the remaining sculptures being beautifully carved horses, but it has been suggested that the scene depicts either the abduction of Hippodameia by Pelops, the abduction of the Leucippides by the Dioscuri, or the abduction of Persephone by Hades.

The reliefs were painted over with vivid shades of green, blue, red, and gold, thus creating a unique sense of polychromy. Today, the only color visible to the naked eye is the color red, shown mainly when the backs of the shields are shown, but can also sometimes be seen on the hair and clothes of the figures.

The names of the figures were inscribed on the background, most of them still visible in certain lighting conditions today.

=== The façade ===
On the façade of the treasury were two korai (maidens) between the pilasters, instead of columns, to support the architrave. This type of opulent decoration featuring female figures full of motion and plasticity foreshadows the Caryatids erected subsequently at the Erechtheion on the Acropolis of Athens.

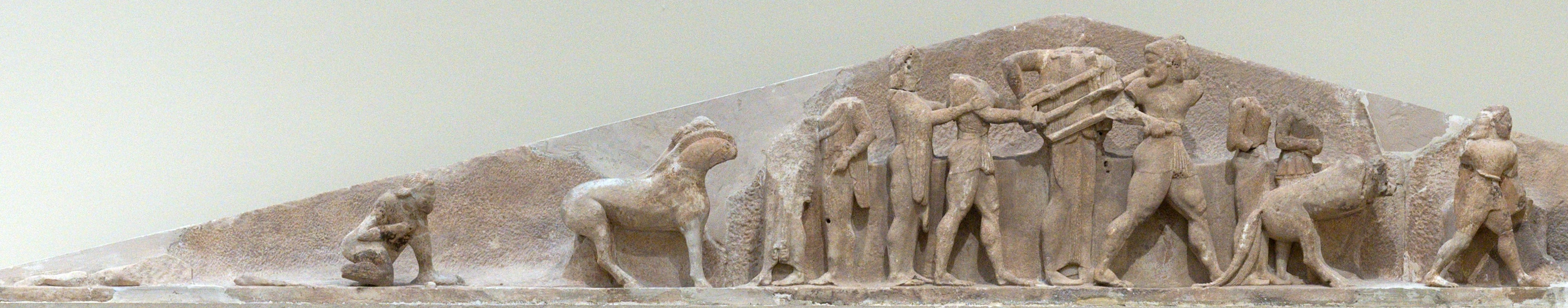
The remaining east pediment

=== The east pediment ===
The east pediment is the only surviving pediment of the Siphnian Treasury and depicts a famous Delphic theme. The pediment depicts the two young gods of Apollo and Heracles competing for the Delphic tripod, with Zeus in the middle trying to separate them and help Apollo get the tripod. The sculpture shows the anger of Heracles because Pythia refused to give him an oracle, since he had not been cleansed from the murder of Iphitus. An outraged Heracles has already managed to seize the sacred tripod, and Apollo is trying to pull it away from him with the help of Zeus.

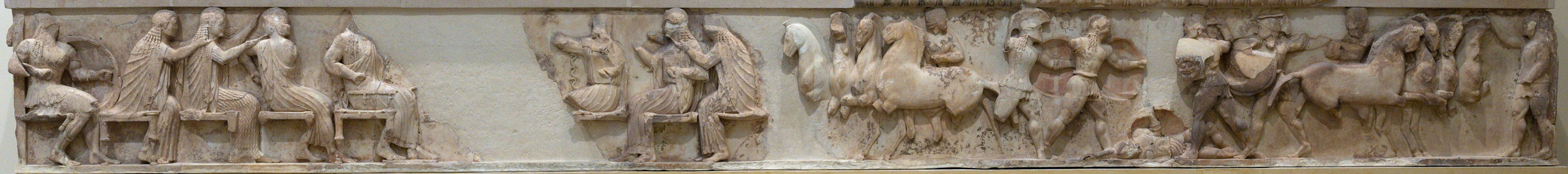
The east frieze

=== The east frieze ===
The east frieze first depicts a scene from the Assembly of the Gods during the Trojan War, where the gods are discussing the issue with lively gestures, as if they are arguing. On the left, we see the gods who side with the Trojans: Ares, Eos, Artemis, and Apollo. To the right, we see the gods who side with the Greeks: Thetis, Hera, and Athena. In the middle, we see Zeus in a lavish throne. The lost part of the frieze would have shown Hermes holding scales while weighing the souls (psychostasia) of Achilles and Memnon.

Then the frieze depicts a scene from the Iliad: Memnon and Achilles fighting over the dead body of the warrior Antilochus, where the two adversaries are flanked by the heroes of the Achaeans on the right and those of the Trojans respectively on the left. At the far left is the figure of old Nestor, encouraging the Greeks.

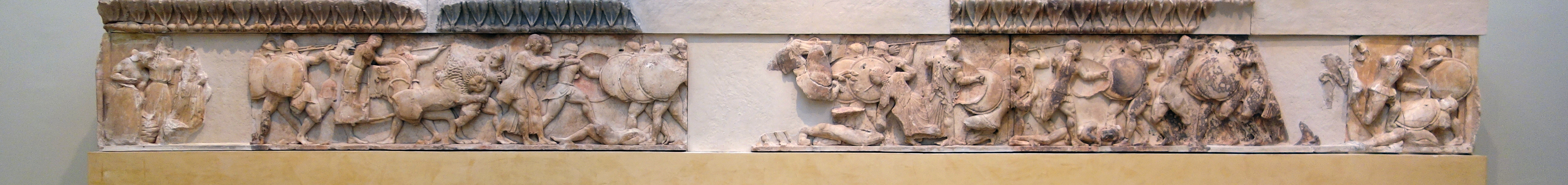
The north frieze

=== The north frieze ===
The theme on the north frieze depicts the Gigantomachy: the battle of the sons of the Earth, the Giants, and the Olympian gods for power. It is a widespread myth about the conflict between the old and the new world order, depicted very frequently in ancient Greek art. It symbolizes the triumph of order and civilization over savagery, barbarism and anarchy. On one side are the Giants. Heavily armed with helmets, shields, breastplates, and greaves, they are attacking the gods from the right with spears, swords, and stones. On the opposite side are the gods. First, Hephaestus stands out with his short chiton, standing in front of his bellows and manufacturing a weapon. He is followed by two uncertain female figures fighting two Giants, then Dionysus, and Themis on her chariot drawn by lions. A pair of gods who are shooting their arrows against the Giants must be Artemis and Apollo. They are followed by the other gods, but these sculptures do not survive in good condition.

This side of the frieze could be seen from the Sacred Way, as the pilgrims ascended towards the Oracle. This way, they had the opportunity to admire the scene of Gigantomachy, which transforms through the artistic relief into a narrative, unfolding in multiple levels, which nevertheless maintains its visibility, consistency, and figurative nature despite the interwoven figures and the various action scenes.

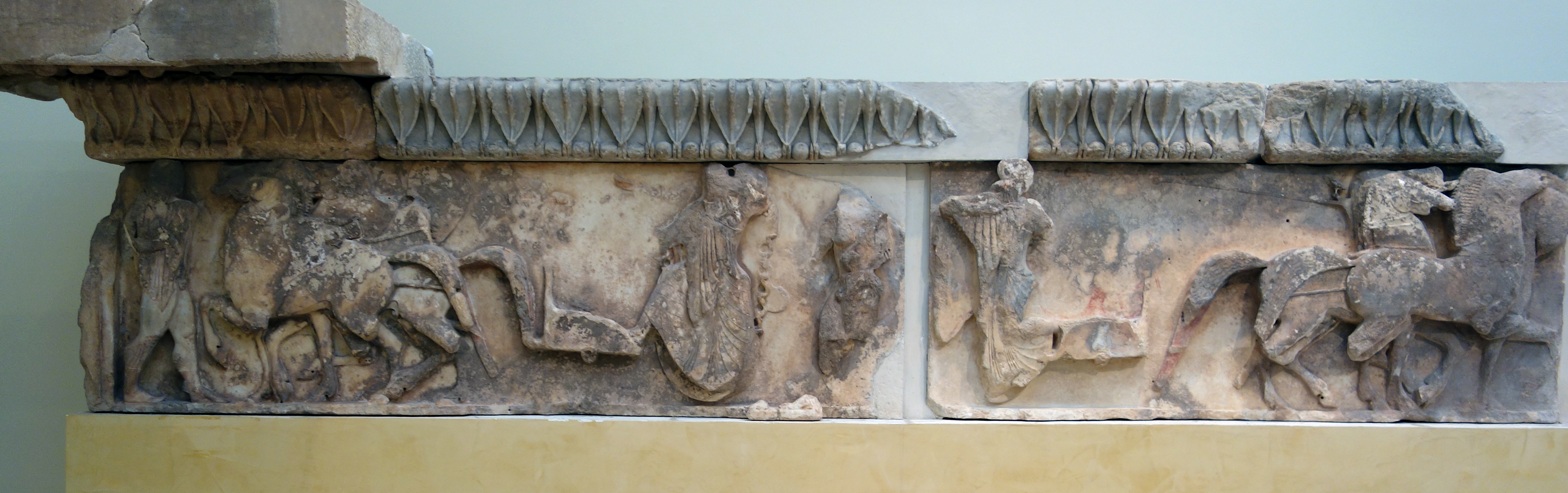
The west frieze

=== The west frieze ===
Unfortunately, only a few relief figures have survived on the west frieze. The theme portrayed here is traditionally thought to be the Judgement of Paris, where the most beautiful goddess would be selected from among Aphrodite, Hera, and Athena. The first goddess coming to be judged is Athena, standing proud on the winged chariot with Hermes as her charioteer. Elsewhere, we see Aphrodite descending from her chariot, with a particular grace, holding the strings of what some interpret to be a necklace. In the section of the frieze that has been lost, one could imagine Hera mounting her chariot angrily to depart after her rejection.

This interpretation has come under scrutiny, however. Neer writes that the Judgement narrative has been somewhat forced upon this frieze, spending too much time on glaring blanks and not enough analyzing what little evidence is present. A major issue lies in the identity of the goddess traditionally thought to be Aphrodite. Although some Hellenistic bronzes do depict Aphrodite with a necklace, there are no examples of this in Archaic art, suggesting that it is something else being held. Neer proposes that these lines are not a necklace, but instead the drawn string of a bow. This interpretation suggests that the figure in question is actually Artemis, changing the narrative of the frieze entirely. This identification is solidified by the fact that Siphnians worshiped Artemis "Of the Disembarkation." Going along with this assertion, one can assume that the missing figure is not Hera, but instead a victim of Artemis' wrath. Though little can confirm this figure's identity, there is a significant hint: palm trees are visible behind Artemis' horses, which is a common Attic painting device to indicate a desolate place. Palm trees are especially connected to the island of Delos, as it was beneath a palm tree on this island that Artemis and Apollo were born. According to Homeric myth, Artemis killed only one person on Delos: Orion. Though this identification cannot be proven outright, it at least accounts for the palm trees, the unusual necklace, and the way that the goddesses appear to be leaving, an extremely uncommon posture in depictions of the Judgement of Paris.

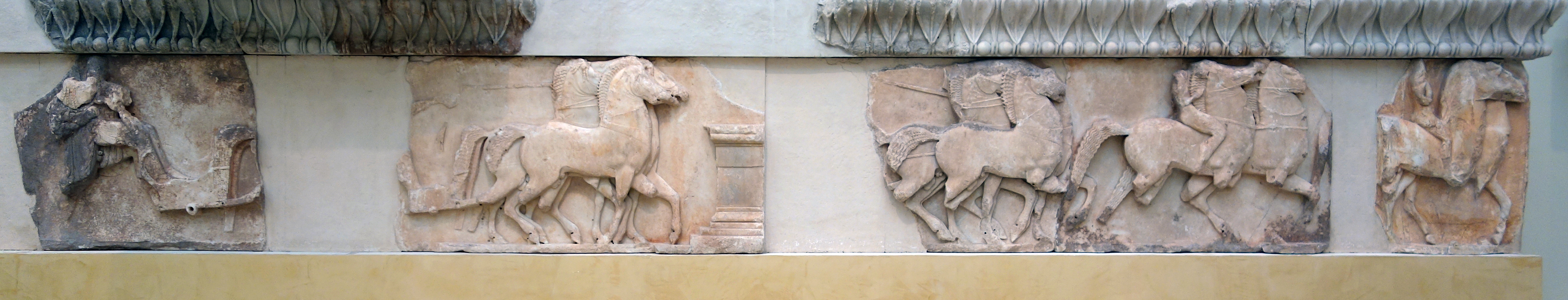
The south frieze

=== The south frieze ===
Significant portions of the south frieze are missing, so we can only imagine the theme it portrayed. It is probably also a popular theme of abducting women. However, the surviving fragments are the relief, well-sculpted horses portrayed full of energy, which prove the mastery of the artist. As for the craftsmen who worked on the frieze, the opinions of researchers and scholars who studied it are conflicting. Initially, it was believed that it was the work of two different artistic workshops. Gradually, however, this view has been abandoned. It is most likely that there were two main sculptors, around whom two groups of craftsmen worked together. The artist of the north and east sides of the frieze seems more progressive, with his depictions being more active, imaginative, and vibrant. In contrast, the artist of south and west side of the frieze insisted on more conservative options, without the bold inspiration and craftsmanship of the first, but with a strong painter-like character and an ionic "color".

== Gallery ==
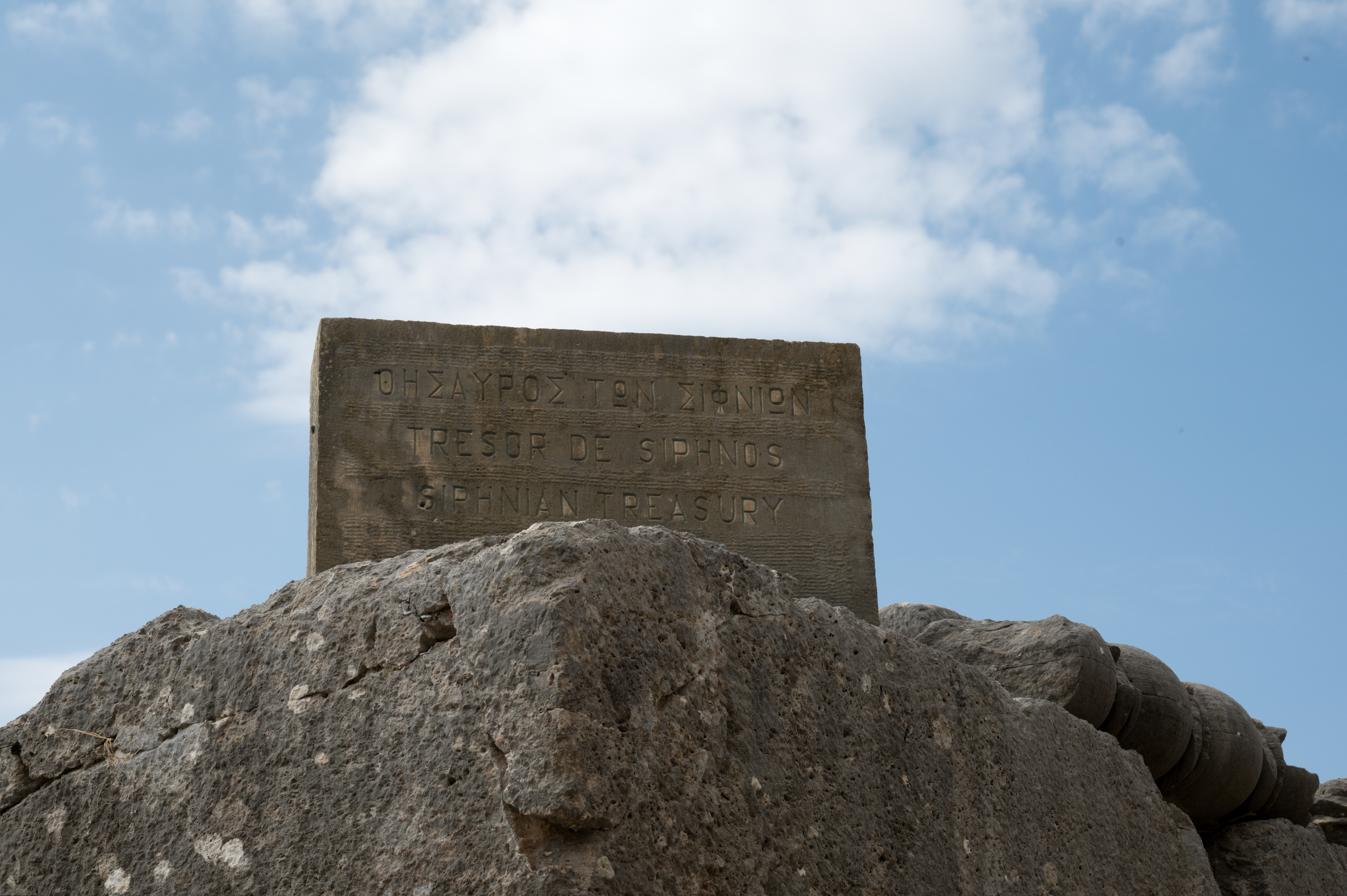
Modern inscription on the foundation of the treasury

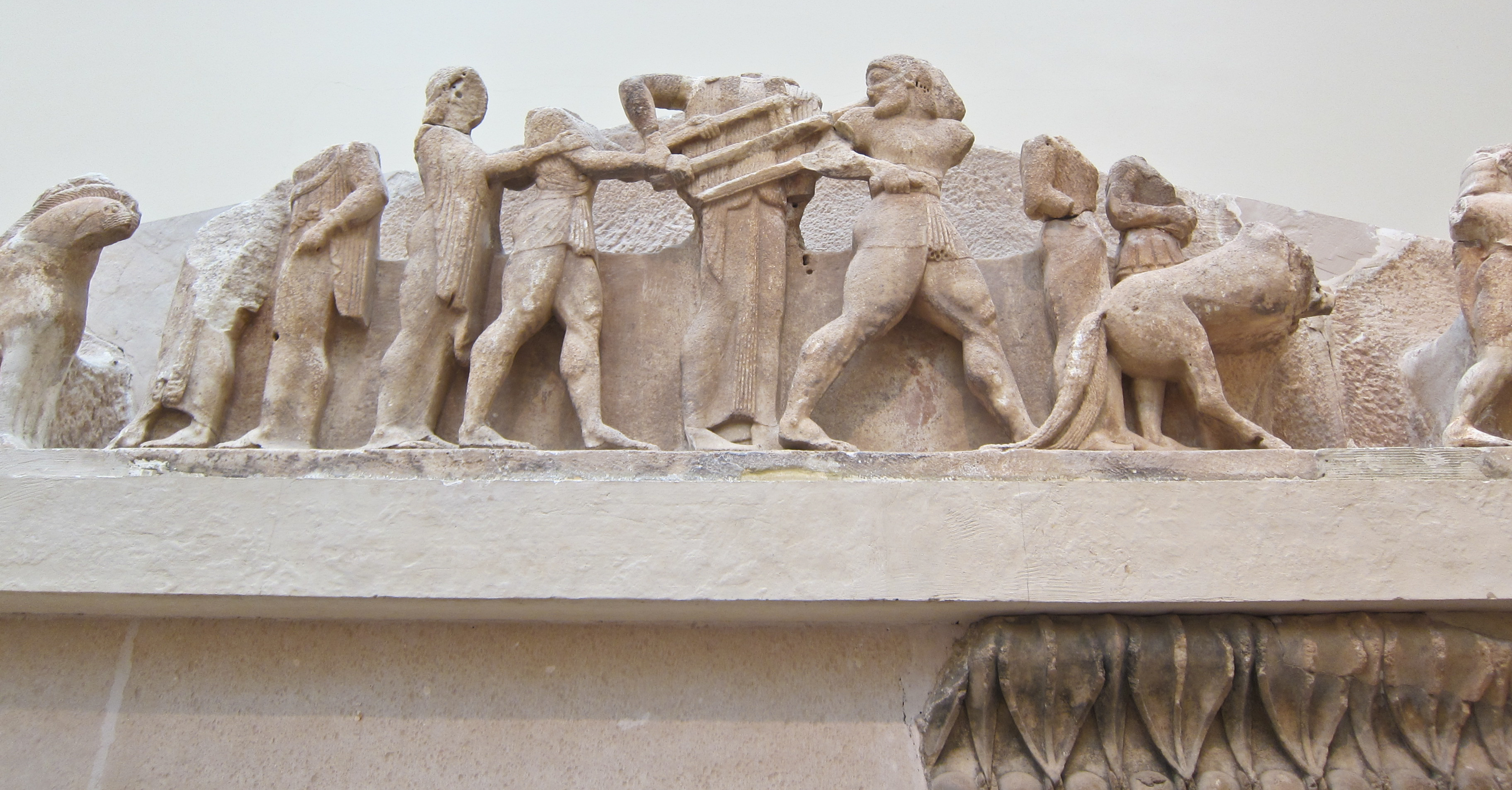
Detail of the east pediment showing the dispute between Heracles and Apollo

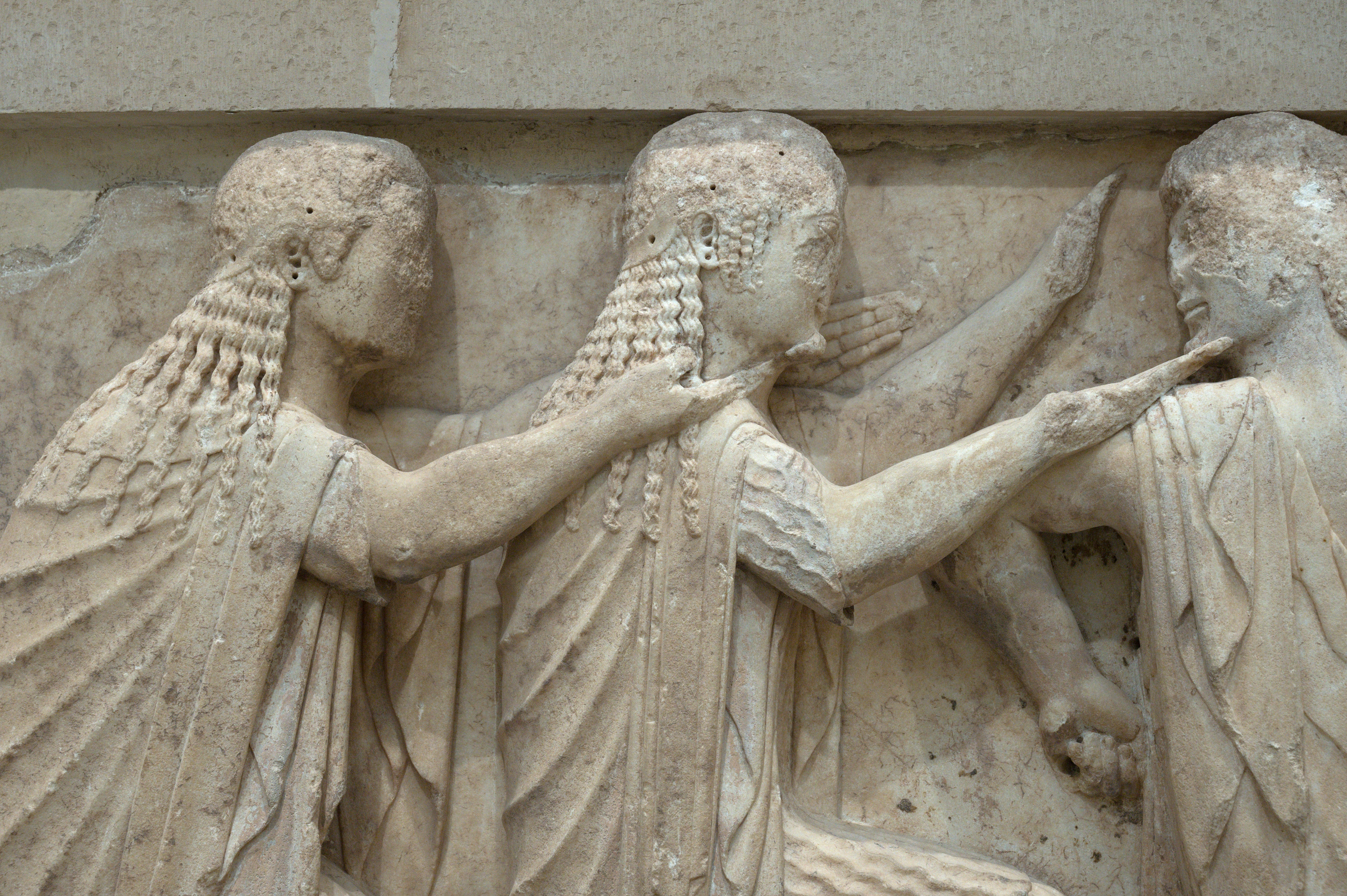
Detail of the east frieze showing Eos, Artemis and Apollo in discourse

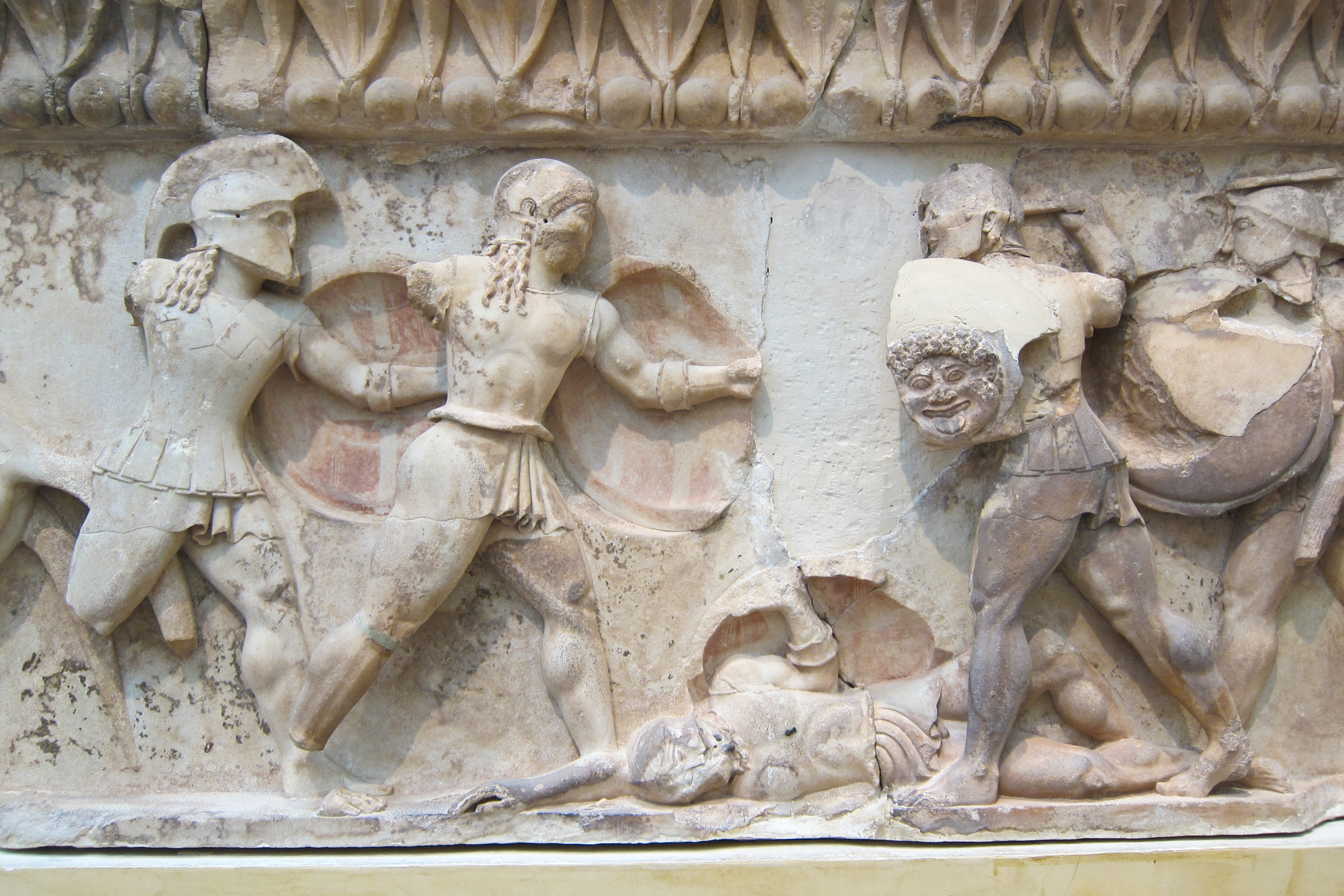
Detail of the east frieze showing Memnon and Achilles fighting over the body of Antilochus

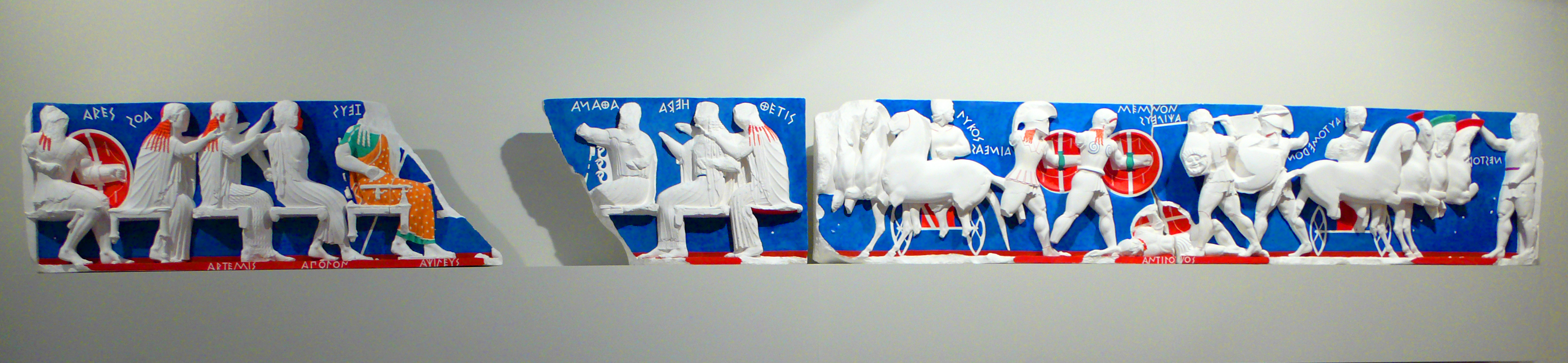
An experimental reconstruction of the original polychrome of the east frieze. From the Gods in Color exhibition.

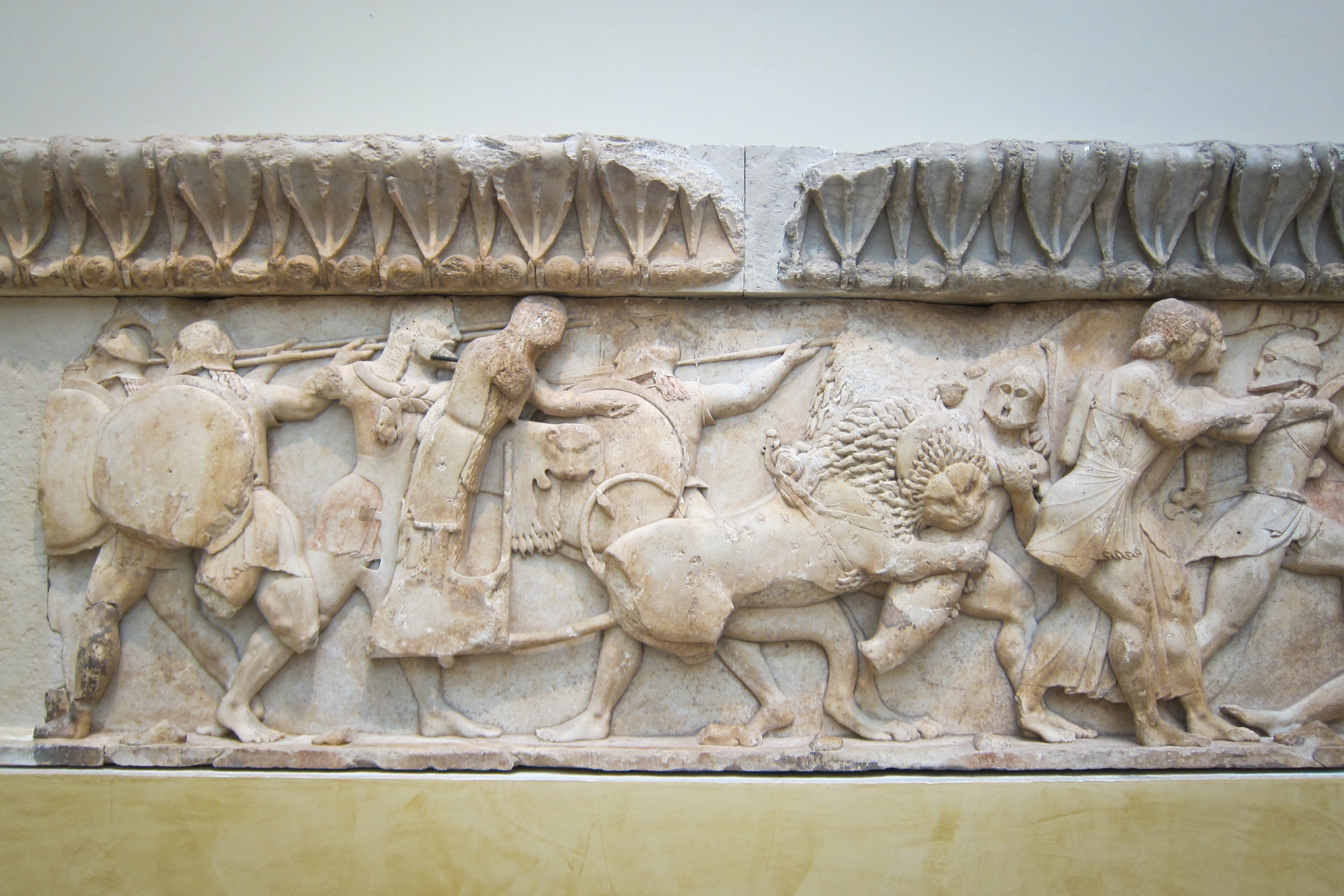
Detail of the north frieze showing the lion-pulled chariot of Dionysus, ridden by Themis, attacking a Giant

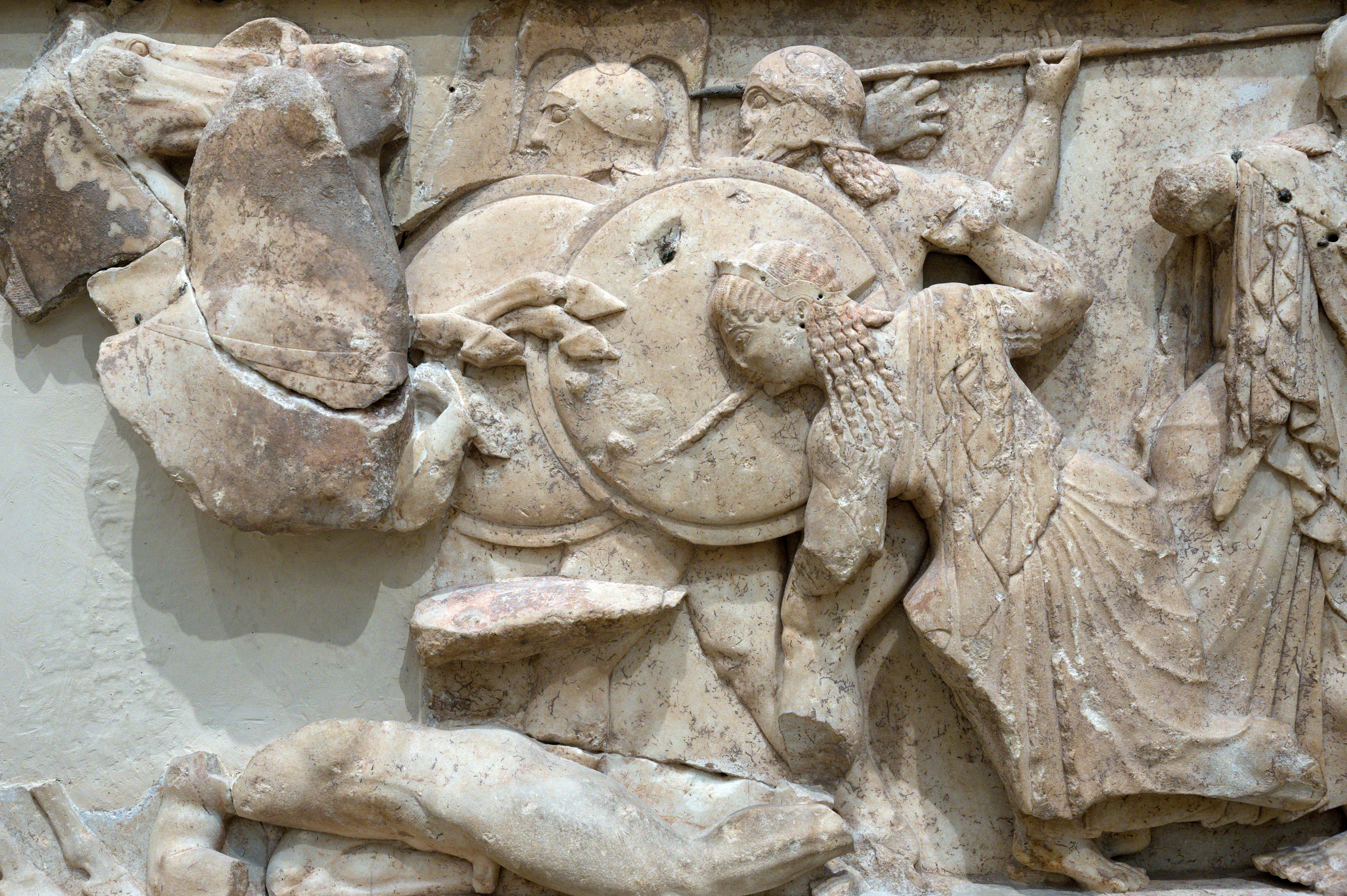
Detail of the north frieze showing an uncertain female figure attacking a fallen Giant

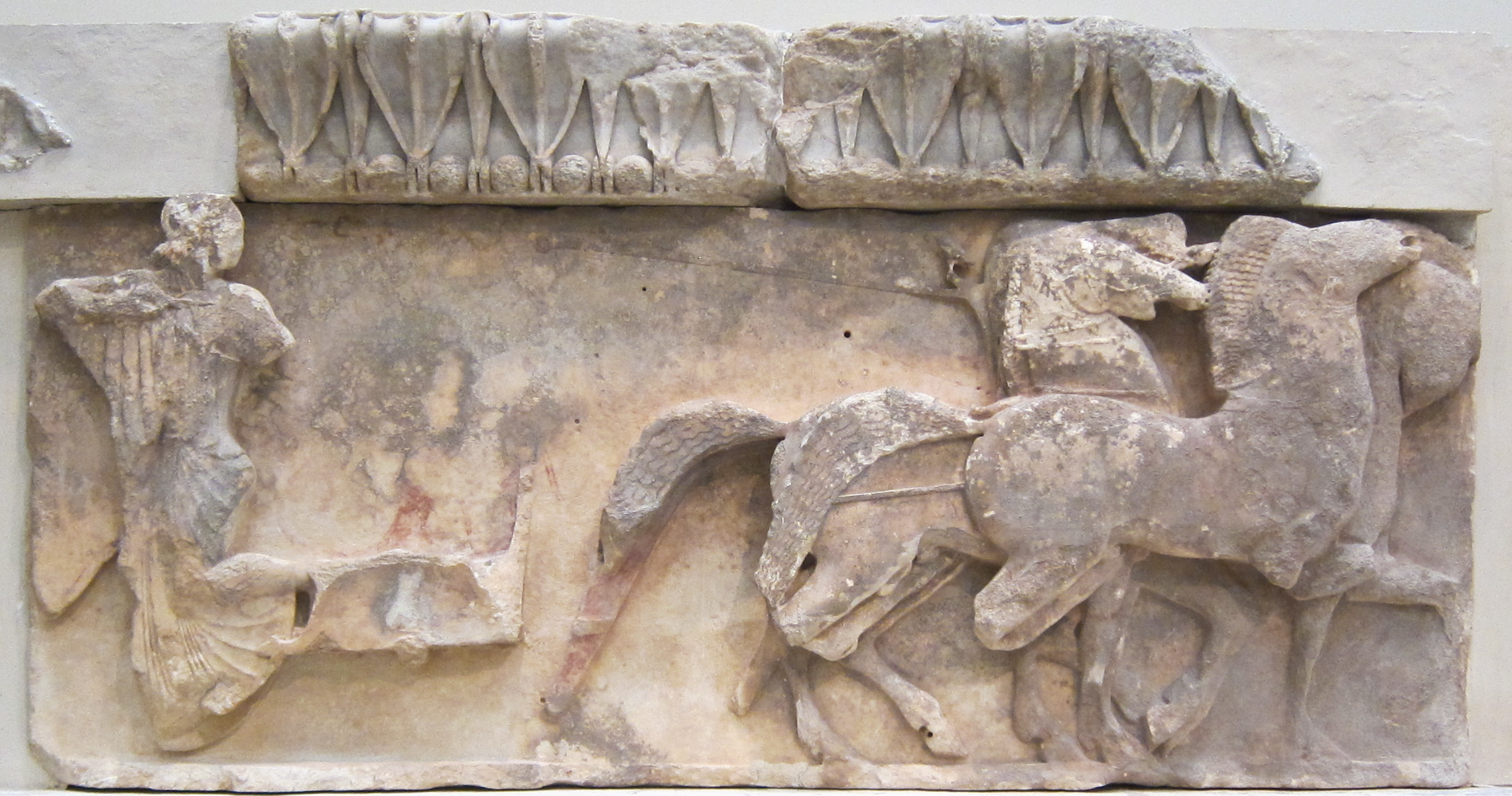
A detail of the west frieze showing Aphrodite (or Artemis) descending from her chariot

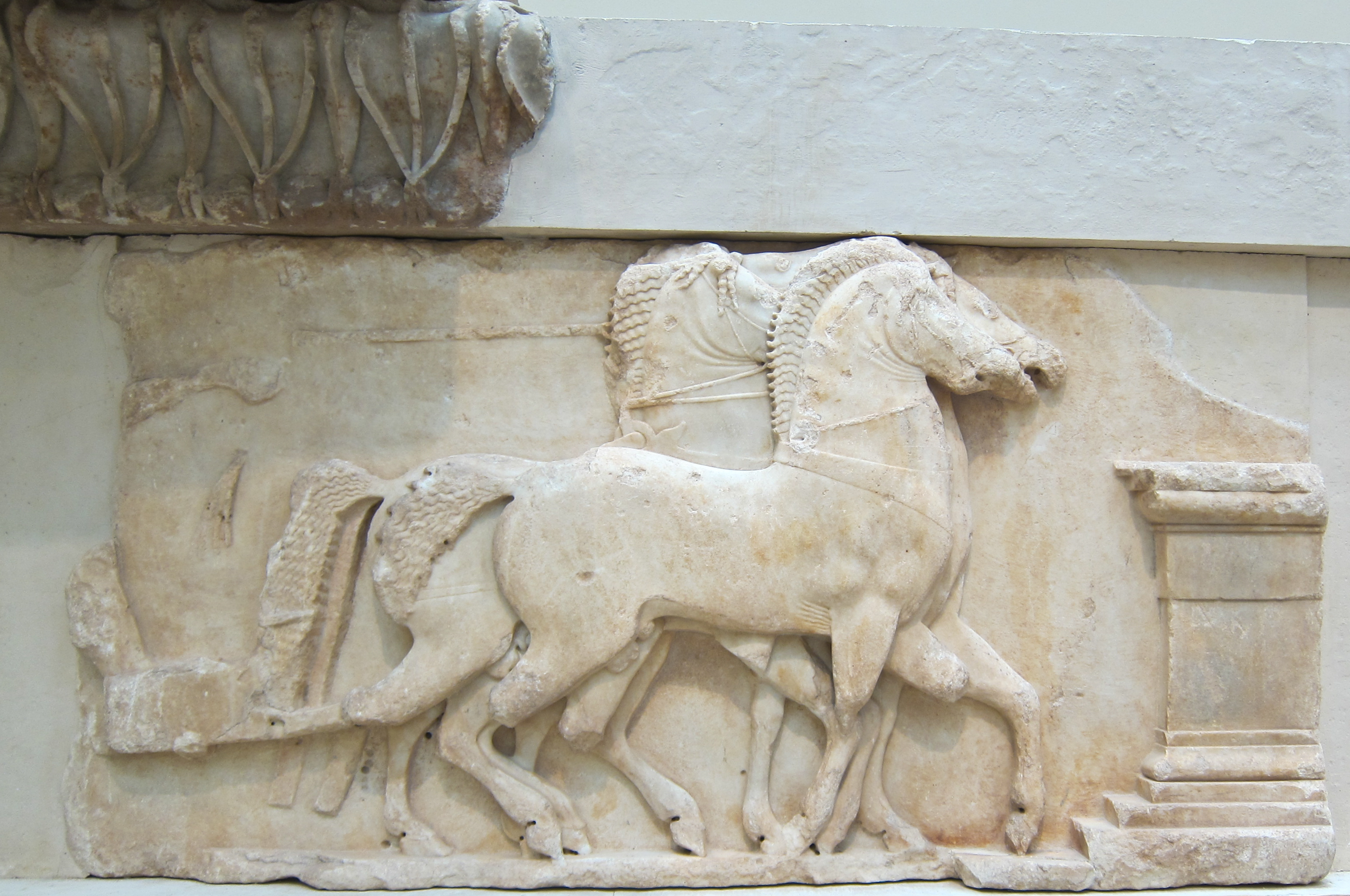
Detail of the south frieze showing a quadriga near an altar

== See also ==
- Athenian Treasury
- Boeotian Treasury
- Sicyonian Treasury
- Theban Treasury

== Bibliography ==
- Daux, Georges; Hansen, Erik (1987). Le trésor de Siphnos: Fouilles de Delphes. Tome 2, Topographie et architecture. Paris: De Boccard. p. 471.
