= Erythromycin 3''-O-methyltransferase =

Enzyme

Identifiers
- EC no.: 2.1.1.254

Databases
- IntEnz: IntEnz view
- BRENDA: BRENDA entry
- ExPASy: NiceZyme view
- KEGG: KEGG entry
- MetaCyc: metabolic pathway
- PRIAM: profile
- PDB structures: RCSB PDB PDBe PDBsum
Search
- PMC: articles
- PubMed: articles
- NCBI: proteins

Erythromycin 3''-O-methyltransferase (EC 2.1.1.254, EryG) is an enzyme with systematic name S-adenosyl-L-methionine:erythromycin C 3''-O-methyltransferase. This enzyme catalyses two related chemical reactions. The first is the final step in the biosynthesis of the antibiotic, erythromycin A:

erythromycin C
+ SAM
erythromycin A
+ SAH

This is a methylation reaction at the 3-position of the mycarose group; the methyl group comes from the cofactor, S-adenosyl methionine (SAM), which becomes S-adenosyl-L-homocysteine (SAH). The enzyme was characterised from Saccharopolyspora erythraea.

The enzyme can also convert erythromycin D to erythromycin B.

erythromycin D
erythromycin B
