= S. erythraeae =

S. erythraeae may refer to:

- Sansevieria erythraeae Mattei, a succulent plant species in the genus Sansevieria
- Sonchus erythraeae Schweinf. ex Penz., a dandelion species in the genus Sonchus

Synonyms

- Setaria erythraeae Mattei, a synonym for Setaria pumila, a grass species

== See also ==
- S. erythraea (disambiguation)
