= Erythraean =

Erythraean or Erythraian may refer to:

- Eritrea
- Erythraean Sibyl, the prophetess of classical antiquity presiding over the Apollonian oracle at Erythrae, a town in Ionia
- Erythraean Sea, the name in ancient cartography for a body of water located between the Horn of Africa and the Arabian Peninsula, now identified as the Gulf of Aden

== See also ==
- Erythraea (disambiguation)
