= Erythraea =

Erythraea or Erythraia may refer to:

- Eritrea
- Erythraea (Crete), a town of ancient Crete, Greece
- Erythraea (genus), a synonym for Centaurium, a plant genus in the family Gentianaceae

== See also ==
- Erythraean (disambiguation)
- Erythrae (disambiguation)
