= Erythrae (disambiguation) =

Erythrae is an ancient Ionian city in Asia Minor.

Erythrae, Erythrai (ancient Greek: Ἐρυθραί), or Erythra may also refer to:

- Erythrae (Ainis), a city of Ainis, ancient Thessaly, Greece
- Erythrae (Boeotia), a city of ancient Boeotia, Greece
- Erythrae (Locris), a city of ancient Locris, Greece

== Classic literature sources ==
Chronological listing of classical literature sources for Erythrae:

- Homer, Iliad 2. 499 ff (trans. Murray) (Greek epic poetry C8th BC)
- Euripides, The Bacchantes 747 ff (trans. Coleridge) (Greek tragedy C5th BC)
- Herodotus 1. 142 (trans. Godley) (Greek history C5th BC)
- Herodotus 9. 15
- Herodotus 9. 22
- Herodotus 9. 25
- Thucydides 3. 24 (trans. Smith) (Greek history C5th BC)
- Thucydides 8. 24
- Thucydides 8. 28
- Thucydides 8. 32
- Thucydides 8. 33
- Xenophon, Hellenica 5. 4. 40 ff (trans. Brownson) (Greek History C4th BC)
- Aristotle, Politica 5. 6. 19 ff or 1035b ff (trans. Jowett) (Greek philosopher C4th BC)
- Pseudo-Aristotle, De Mirabilibus Auscultationibus 838a ff or 95. 8 ff (ed. Ross trans. Dowdall) (Greek rhetoric C4th to 3rd BC)
- Theophrastus, Enquiry into Plants, Concerning Odours, 48 ff (trans. Hort) (Greek philosophy C4th to C3rd BC)
- Theophrastus, Enquiry into Plants, Concerning Odours, 52 ff
- Herodas, The Mimes and Fragments 6. 57 ff (trans. Headlam ed. Knox) (Greek poetry C3rd BC)
- Diodorus Siculus, Library of History 5. 79. 1 ff (trans. Oldfather) (Greek history C1st BC)
- Diodorus Siculus, Library of History 11. 29. 4 ff
- Diodorus Siculus, Library of History 20. 107. 5 ff
- Livy, The History of Rome 27. 8 (trans. M'Devitte) (Roman history C1st BC to C1st AD)
- Livy, The History of Rome 28. 8. 8 ff (trans. Moore)
- Livy, The History of Rome 45. 28. 8 ff (trans. Schlesinger)
- Strabo, Geography 14. 1. 3 (trans. Jones) (Greek geography C1st BC to C1st AD)
- Strabo, Geography 14. 1. 31
- Strabo, Geography 14. 1. 32
- Strabo, Geography 14. 1. 33
- Strabo, Geography 14. 1. 34
- Statius, Thebaid 7. 265 ff (trans. Mozley) (Roman epic poetry C1st AD)
- Statius, Thebaid 9. 769 ff
- Pliny, Natural History 4. 7. 27 (trans. Rackham) (Roman history C1st AD
- Pliny, Natural History 5. 31. 116 ff (trans. Rackham)
- Pliny, Natural History 5. 38 (Chios) (trans. Bostock & Riley)
- Pliny, Natural History 11. 36 (trans. Rackham)
- Pliny, Natural History 31. 10 (trans. Jones)
- Pliny, Natural History 32. 11 (trans. Jones)
- Pliny, Natural History 35. 46 (Works in Pottery) (trans. Bostock & Riley)
- Tacitus, The Annals 6. 12 (trans. Church) (Roman history C1st to C2nd AD)
- Plutarch, Moralia, The Oracles at Delphi 401 ff (trans. Babbitt) (Greek history C1st to C2nd AD)
- Plutarch, Moralia, The Oracles At Delphi 403 B ff
- Plutarch, Moralia, Table-Talk 5. 675 B ff (trans. Clement & Hoffleit)
- Pausanias, Description of Greece 6. 15. 3. 6 ff (trans. Frazer) (Greek travelogue C2nd AD)
- Pausanias, Description of Greece 6. 21. 7. 11 ff
- Pausanias, Description of Greece 7. 3. 4
- Pausanias, Description of Greece 7. 3. 5. 10 ff
- Pausanias, Description of Greece 7. 5. 3-4 ff
- Pausanias, Description of Greece 9. 2. 1
- Pausanias, Description of Greece 9. 27. 1
- Pausanias, Description of Greece 9. 27. 5
- Aelian, On Animals 2. 20 (trans. Scholfield) (Greek natural history C2nd AD)
- Appian, The Mithridatic Wars 46 (trans. White) (Greek history C2nd AD)
- Athenaeus, Banquet of the Learned 6. 75 (trans. Yonge) (Greek rhetoric C2nd to C3rd AD)
- Fragment, Theopompus (or Cratippus), Hellenica, Constitution of Boeotia (P. Oxy. 842, The Oxyrhynchus Papyri trans. Grenfell & Hunt 1908 Vol 5 p. 223) (Greek history C2nd to C3rd AD)
- Scholiast on Theopompus (or Cratippus), Hellenica, Constitution of Boeotia 12-13 (The Oxyrhynchus Papyri trans. Grenfell & Hunt 1908 Vol 5 p. 226)
- Pseudo-Herodotus, Life of Homer (trans. Mackenzie) (The Greek Classics Vol 2 ed. Miller 1909 Epic Literature p. 397) (Greek Epic poetry C3rd to C4th AD)

Chronological listing of classical literature sources for Erythra:

- Propertius, Elegies, 2. 13. 1 ff (trans. Butler) (Latin poetry C1st BC)
- Strabo, Geography 16. 3. 1 (trans. Jones) (Greek geography C1st BC to C1st AD)
- Strabo, Geography 16. 4. 20
- Athenaeus, Banquet of the Learned 3. 77 Loaves (trans. Yonge) (Greek rhetoric C2nd to C3rd AD)
- Pausanias, Description of Greece 6. 21. 7. 11 ff (trans. Frazer) (Greek travelogue C2nd AD)
- Philostratus, Life of Apollonius of Tyana 50 (trans. Conyreare) (Greek travelogue C3rd AD)
- Philostratus, Life of Apollonius of Tyana 53

== See also ==
- Erythraea (disambiguation)
- Erythras
