= Theban Treasury (Delphi) =

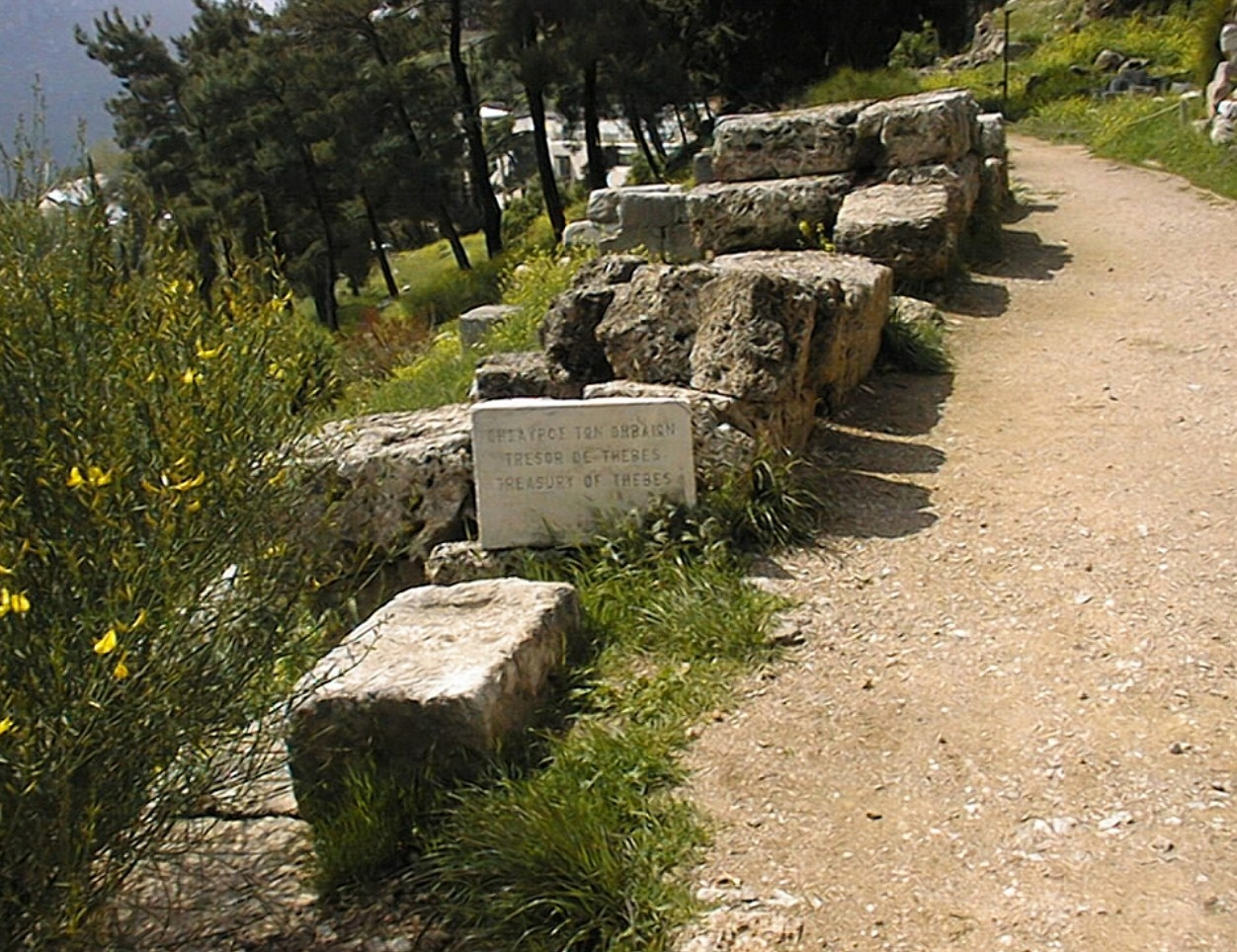
The Treasury of the Thebans

The Treasury of the Thebans at Delphi was built in the Doric order and made entirely out of local limestone from the quarries of St. Elias close to the town of Chrisso. It was situated a few meters below the first turn of the Sacred Way, the processional route in the sanctuary of Apollo. It had been dedicated by the Thebans for their victory against the Lacedaemonians at Leuctra (371 BC).

== Description ==
Shortly after their victory against the Lacaedemonians at the Battle of Leuctra in 371 BC, a landmark of the brief Theban supremacy in the political life of Greece, the Thebans dedicated at the sanctuary of Apollo a treasury built in the Doric order. It was the largest treasury in dimensions of Delphi, situated close to the SW corner of the sanctuary. Rectangular in plan, measuring 12.29 by 7.21 meters, it stood on a crepis with two steps. It was constructed entirely out of local limestone from the quarries at St. Elias, a particularly hard stone with bluish-grey shades, which accentuates the austere style of the Doric building. Thus, the Treasury of the Thebans made a visual contrast to the nearby Siphnian Treasury, with its colourful and decorative Ionian style. A frieze with metopes and triglyphs ran all around the building.

Several opinions have been expressed regarding its actual architectural form. The current views, however, suggest that it was a uniform building, without columns, possibly with two entrances on the narrow sides and with a vertical wall functioning as boulder. An opening along the western wall provided natural lighting in the building.
