= Erythrae (Ainis) =

Coordinates: 38°50′46″N 22°23′05″E

Erythrae or Erythrai (Ancient Greek: Ἐρυθραί) was a town in Ainis in ancient Thessaly.

It is tentatively located near Phrantzi.
