= Boeotian Treasury =

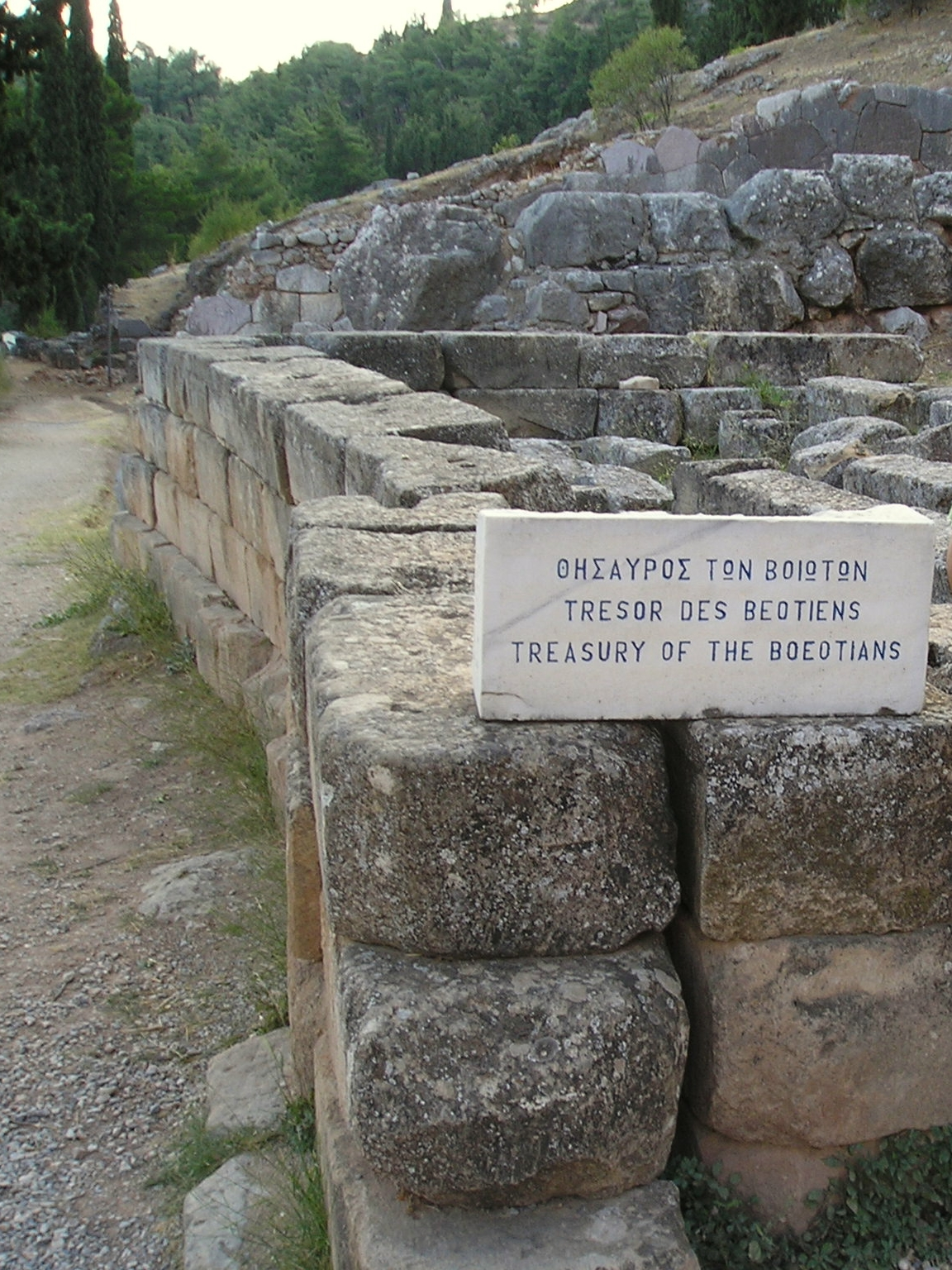
Treasury of the Boeotians at Delphi.

The Treasury of the Boeotians was dedicated within the sanctuary of Apollo at Delphi during the late Archaic period. It is identified due to some epigraphic material.

== Description ==
At the southwestern end of the Sacred Way in the sanctuary of Apollo at Delphi lie the foundations of a treasury believed to have been dedicated by the Boeotians. Pausanias does not mention this particular building, thus it is possible that it had been destroyed by his time. The surviving architectural elements indicate that it was a Doric limestone building bearing inscriptions in the Boeotian writing style of the Late Archaic period have been preserved. According to these inscriptions, the building is dated to ca 525 B.C.

== Bibliography ==
- Bommelaer, J.-F., Laroche, D.,1991, Guide de Delphes. Le site, Sites et Monuments 7, Paris, 128
- De la Coste Messelière, P.,1936,Au Musée des Delphes, Paris, Paris, pp. 469, 474.
- Partida, E., 2000, The Treasures at Delphi, an Architectural Study, Jonsered 2000, 192-198.
- Partida, E., 2000, “Two Boeotian Treasures at Delphi”, in Αραβαντινός, Β. (ed.), Επετηρίς Εταιρείας Βοιωτικών Μελετών, 3, Αθήνα, pp. 536–564.
