= Erythraea (Crete) =

Erythraea or Erythraia (Ancient Greek: Ἐρυθραῖα) was an ancient town in Crete. Its location is unknown. Florus mentions it alongside Kydonia and Knossos as submitting to Quintus Caecilius Metellus Creticus.
