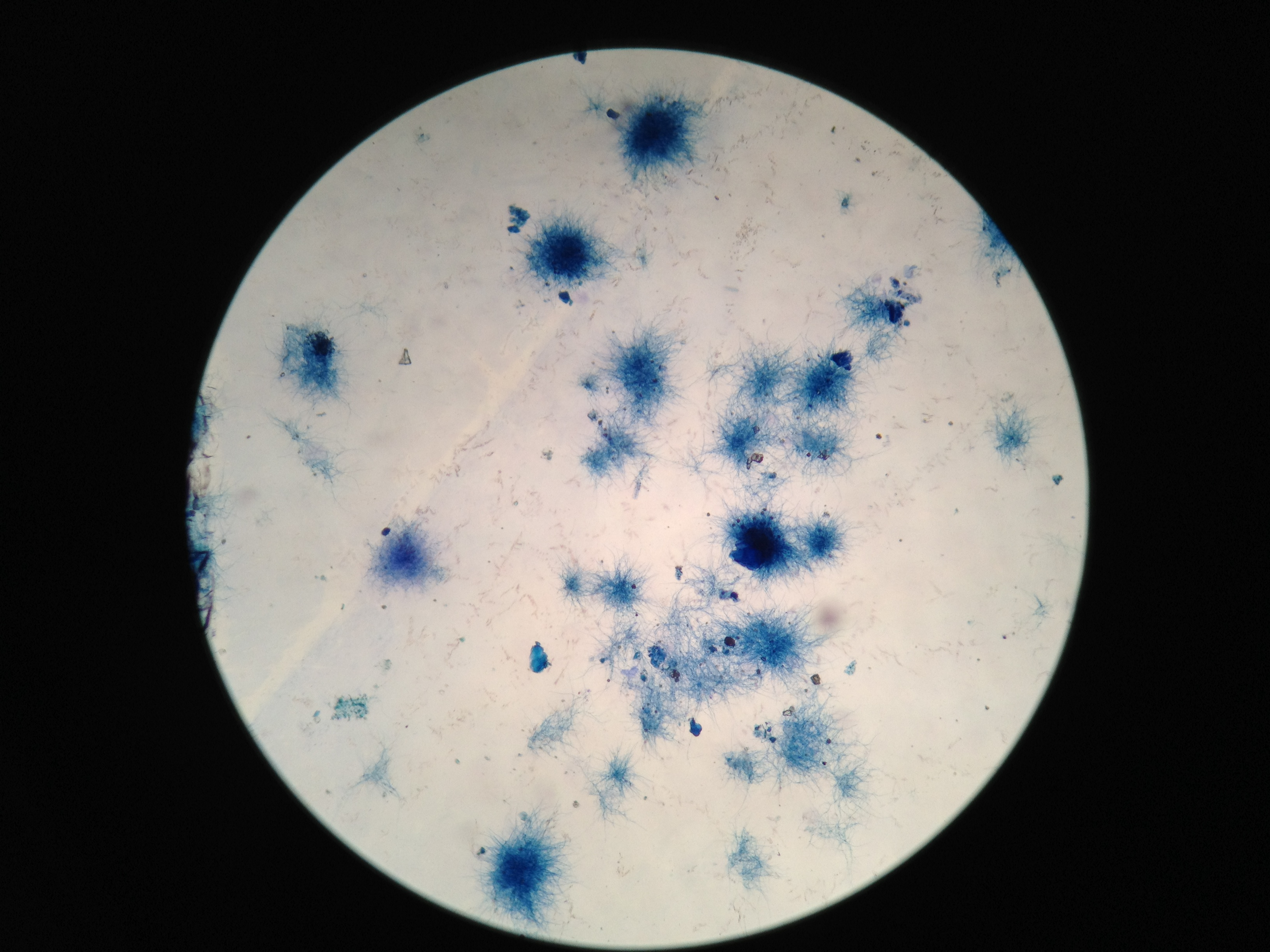

Scientific classification
- Domain: Bacteria
- Kingdom: Bacillati
- Phylum: Actinomycetota
- Class: Actinomycetes
- Order: Pseudonocardiales
- Family: Pseudonocardiaceae
- Genus: Saccharopolyspora
- Species: S. erythraea

Binomial name
- Saccharopolyspora erythraea (Waksman 1923) Labeda 1987

Synonyms
- "Actinomyces erythreus" Waksman 1923; Streptomyces erythraeus (Waksman 1923) Waksman and Henrici 1948 (Approved Lists 1980)

= Saccharopolyspora erythraea =

Species of bacterium

Saccharopolyspora erythraea is a species of actinomycete bacteria within the genus Saccharopolyspora.

Saccharopolyspora erythraea produces the macrolide antibiotic erythromycin. Cytochrome P450 eryF (CYP107A1) originally from the bacterium is responsible for the biosynthesis of the antibiotic by C6-hydroxylation of the macrolide 6-deoxyerythronolide B.

Small non-coding RNAs have been suggested to be involved in regulation of the secondary metabolite biosynthesis.
