= Roman Catholic Diocese of Pesto =

The Roman Catholic Diocese of Pesto (or Paëstum or Pæstum) was a bishopric, later under the name of Capaccio, and became a Latin Catholic titular see in 1966.

== History ==
The diocese was established, perhaps around 400 AD, in Paestum, the Ancient Greco-Roman city now called Pesto in Italian. In the late 6th century, the bishops of Paestum had to relocate their seat to Agropoli (the acropolis). Three letters of Pope Gregory I are directed to Bishop Felix at that site. Louis Duchesne remarks that, in Lucania, after the Gothic War (535–554), there were seven bishoprics; after the Lombards arrived, six of them were destroyed; the only one that survived was Paestum, which was compelled to abandon its seat and seek refuge in the Byzantine fort of Arropolis. He implies that the Lombards were the actual cause.

It is claimed that the diocese of Paestum gained territory in 750 from the suppressed diocese of Sala Consilina. Only two bishops of Consilina are known, however, one between 494 and 496, and the other in 558-560. Likewise, no bishops of Paestum are known between 649 and 932. Circumstances surrounding the date of 750 are unattested, and the exact location of Consilina is uncertain.

Paestum was attacked by the Saracens, who occupied the area of Agripoli, in 915. The city was burned. The inhabitants fled into the mountains, where they built the town that came to be called Capaccio. In 1080, the town was devastated by the Norman Duke Robert Guiscard, and nearly deserted.

In the 11th century, the bishops of Paestum moved their headquarters, without yet changing their title, to the city of Capaccio. Bishop Leonardus (1159) appears to have been the first to use the title episcopus Caputaquensis.

=== Residential Bishops ===
[Florentius (499? – 501?)]

- Felix (attested 592)
- Johannes (attested 649)
- Paulus (attested 932)
- Johannes (attested 954 – 963)
- Petrus (attested 967)
- Pando (attested 977, 979)
- Lando (attested 989)
- Joannes (attested 1019–1020)
- Joannes (attested 1041–1047)
- Amatus (1047–1058)
- Maraldus (attested 1071–1097)
- Alfanus (attested 1100–1134)
- Joannes (attested 1142–1146)
- Celsus (attested 1156)
- Leonardus (attested 1159)

=== Titular see ===
The title, though not the diocese, was nominally restored as a Latin Catholic titular bishopric in 1966. The title has been held by:

- Titular Bishop Alfred Leo Abramowicz, Auxiliary Bishop of Chicago (8 May 1968 – 12 September 1999)
- Titular Bishop Anton Coşa (30 October 1999 – 27 September 2001) Became Bishop of Chişinău, Moldova.
- Titular Archbishop Giovanni D’Aniello (15 December 2001 – ...), Apostolic Nuncio to Uzbekistan (2021).

== See also ==
- Diocese of Capaccio
- Roman Catholic Diocese of Vallo della Lucania
- Catholic Church in Italy

== Bibliography ==
- Cappelletti, Giuseppe (1866). Le chiese d'Italia della loro origine sino ai nostri giorni (in Italian). Vol. vigesimo (20). Venezia: Giuseppe Antonelli. pp. 331–337.
- Duchesne, Louis (1903), "Les évêchés d'Italie et l'invasion lombarde," (in French), in: Mélanges d'archéologie et d'histoire 23 (Paris: Fontemoing 1903), pp. 83–116.
- Duchesne, Louis (1905), "Les évêchés d'Italie et l'invasion lombarde," (in French), in: Mélanges d'archéologie et d'histoire 25 (Paris: Fontemoing 1905), pp. 365–399, esp. 398-399.
- Kehr, Paul Fridolin (1935). Italia pontificia. Vol. VIII: Regnum Normannorum — Campania. Berlin: Weidmann. (in Latin)
- Lanzoni, Francesco (1927). Le diocesi d'Italia dalle origini al principio del secolo VII (an. 604). Faenza: F. Lega. (in Italian)
- Mattei-Cerasoli, Leone (1919). "Da archivii e biblioteche: Di alcuni vescovi poco noti". (in Italian). In: Archivio storico per le province Neapolitane 44 (Napoli: Luigi Lubrano 1919). pp. 310–335.
- Ughelli, Ferdinando; Coleti, NIccolo (1721). Italia sacra sive De episcopis Italiæ, et insularum adjacentium (in Latin). Vol. Tomus septimus (7). Venice: apud Sebastianum Coleti. pp. 464–485.
