= Paestum =

Ruined Ancient Greek and Roman city in southern Italy

- Ποσειδωνία
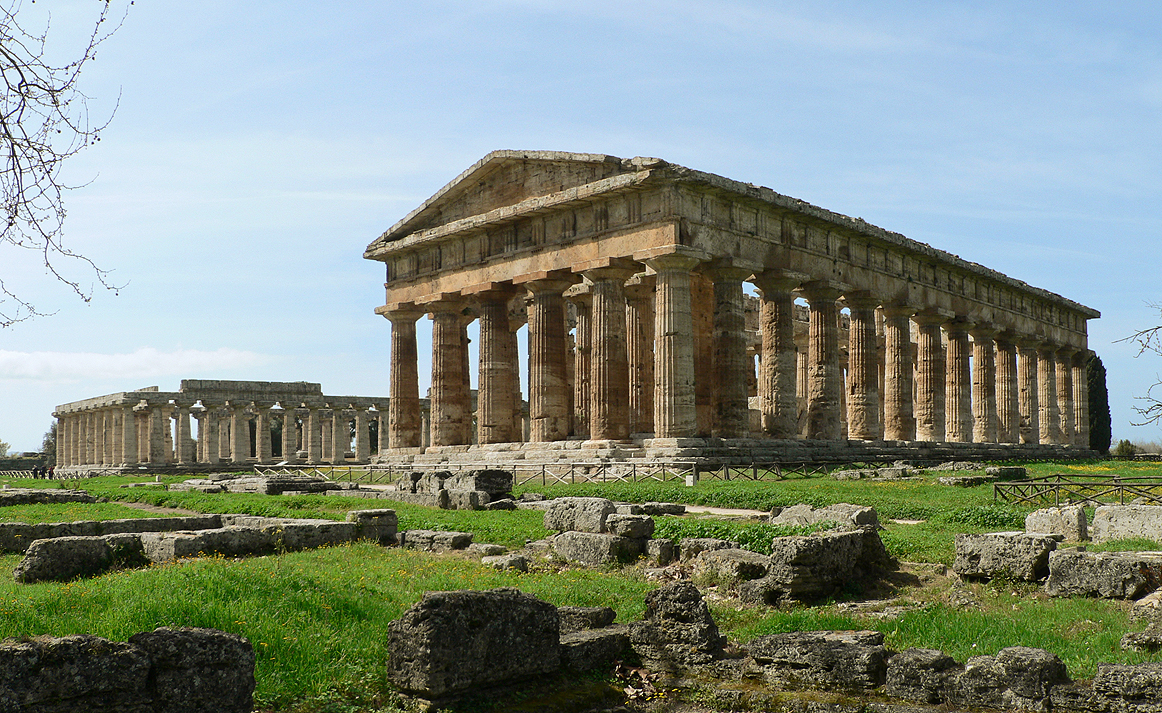
- Paestum contains three of the best-preserved ancient Greek temples in the world, including the two Hera Temples shown above.

- Location within Italy
- 40°25′20″N 15°0′19″E
- Type: Settlement
- Periods: Archaic Greece to Middle Ages
- Location: Paestum, Province of Salerno, Campania, Italy
- Region: Magna Graecia

History
- Built: Around 600 BCE; 2626 years ago
- Built by: Colonists from Sybaris and/or Troezen

Site notes
- Management: Soprintendenza per i Beni Archeologici di Salerno, Avellino, Benevento e Caserta
- Website: www.museopaestum.beniculturali.it (in Italian and English)

UNESCO World Heritage Site
- Official name: Cilento and Vallo di Diano National Park with the Archeological Sites of Paestum and Velia, and the Certosa di Padula
- Type: Cultural
- Criteria: iii, iv
- Designated: 1998 (22nd session)
- Reference no.: 842
- Region: Europe and North America

Paestum (/ˈpɛstəm/ PEST-əm, US also /ˈpiːstəm/ PEE-stəm, Latin: [ˈpae̯stũː]) was a major ancient Greek city on the coast of the Tyrrhenian Sea, in Magna Graecia. The ruins of Paestum are famous for their three ancient Greek temples in the Doric order dating from about 550 to 450 BCE that are in an excellent state of preservation. The city walls and amphitheatre are largely intact, and the bottom of the walls of many other structures remain, as well as paved roads. The site is open to the public, and there is a modern national museum within it, which also contains the finds from the associated Greek site of Foce del Sele.

Paestum was established around 600 BCE by settlers from Sybaris, a Greek colony in southern Italy, under the name of Poseidonia (Ancient Greek: Ποσειδωνία). The city thrived as a Greek settlement for about two centuries, witnessing the development of democracy. In 400 BCE, the Lucanians seized the city. Romans took over in 273 BCE, renaming it Paestum and establishing a Latin colony. Later, its decline ensued from shifts in trade routes and the onset of flooding and marsh formation. As Pesto or Paestum, the town became a bishopric (now only titular), but it was abandoned in the Early Middle Ages, and left undisturbed and largely forgotten until the eighteenth century.

Today the remains of the city are found in the modern frazione of Paestum, which is part of the comune of Capaccio Paestum in the Province of Salerno in the region of Campania, Italy. The modern settlement, directly to the south of the archaeological site, is a popular seaside resort with long sandy beaches. The Paestum railway station on the Naples-Salerno-Reggio Calabria railway line is directly to the east of the ancient city walls.

== Name ==
The Greek settlers who founded the city originally named it Poseidonia (Ancient Greek: Ποσειδωνία). It was eventually conquered by the local Lucanians and later the Romans. The Lucanians renamed it to Paistos and the Romans gave the city its current name.

== Ancient ruins and features ==
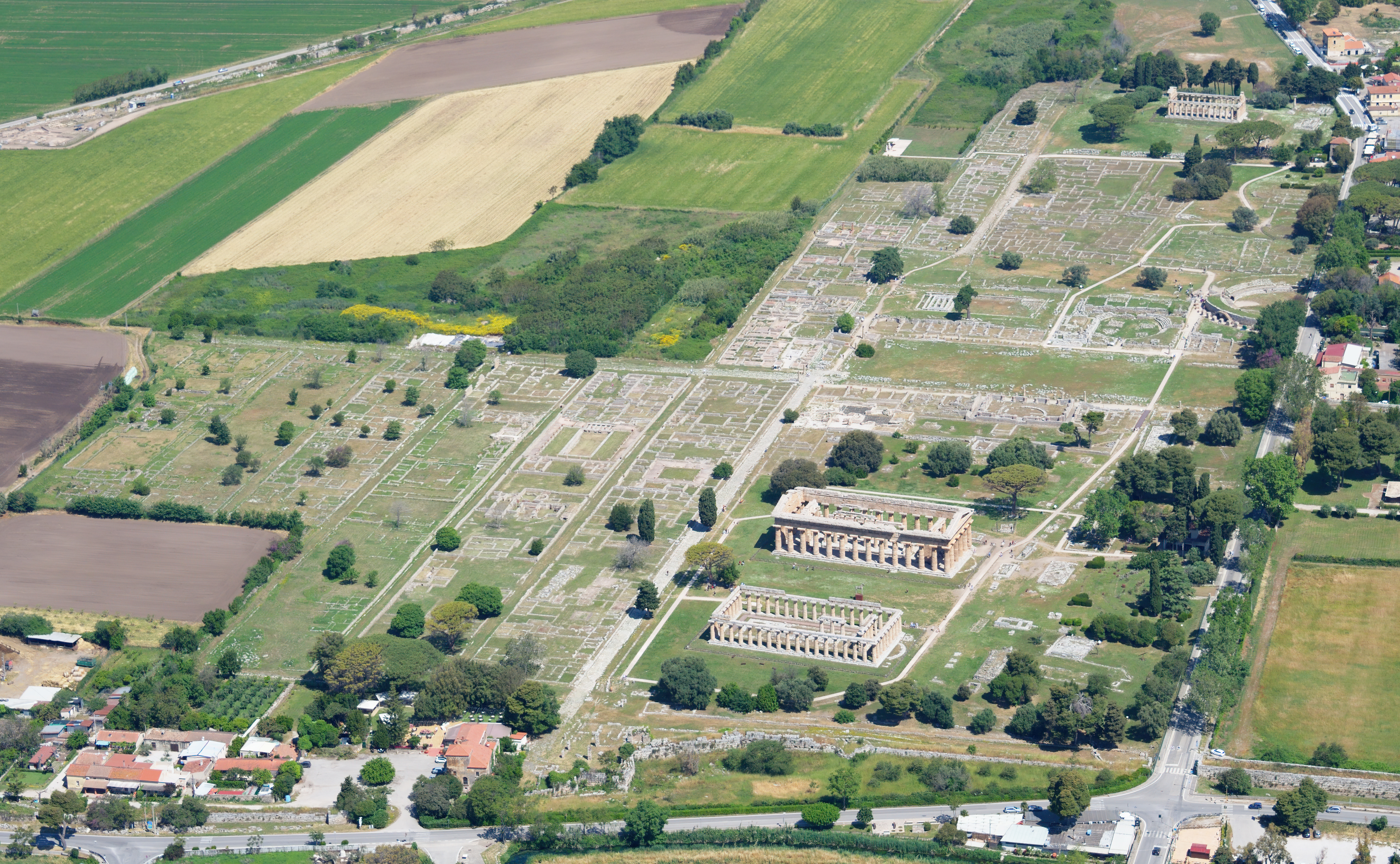
Aerial view of Paestum, looking north; two Hera Temples in foreground, Athena Temple in background.

Much of the most celebrated features of the site today are the three large temples in the Archaic version of the Greek Doric order, dating from about 550 to 450 BCE. All are typical of the period, with massive colonnades having a very pronounced entasis (widening as they go down), and very wide capitals resembling upturned mushrooms. Above the columns, only the second Temple of Hera retains most of its entablature, the other two having only the architrave in place.

These were dedicated to Hera and Athena (Juno and Minerva to the Romans), although previously they often have been identified otherwise, following eighteenth-century arguments. The two temples of Hera are right next to each other, while the Temple of Athena is on the other side of the town center. There were other temples, both Greek and Roman, which are far less well preserved.

Paestum is far from any sources of good marble. Unsurprisingly, the three main temples had few stone reliefs, perhaps using painting instead. Painted terracotta was used for some detailed parts of the structure. The large pieces of terracotta that have survived are in the museum.

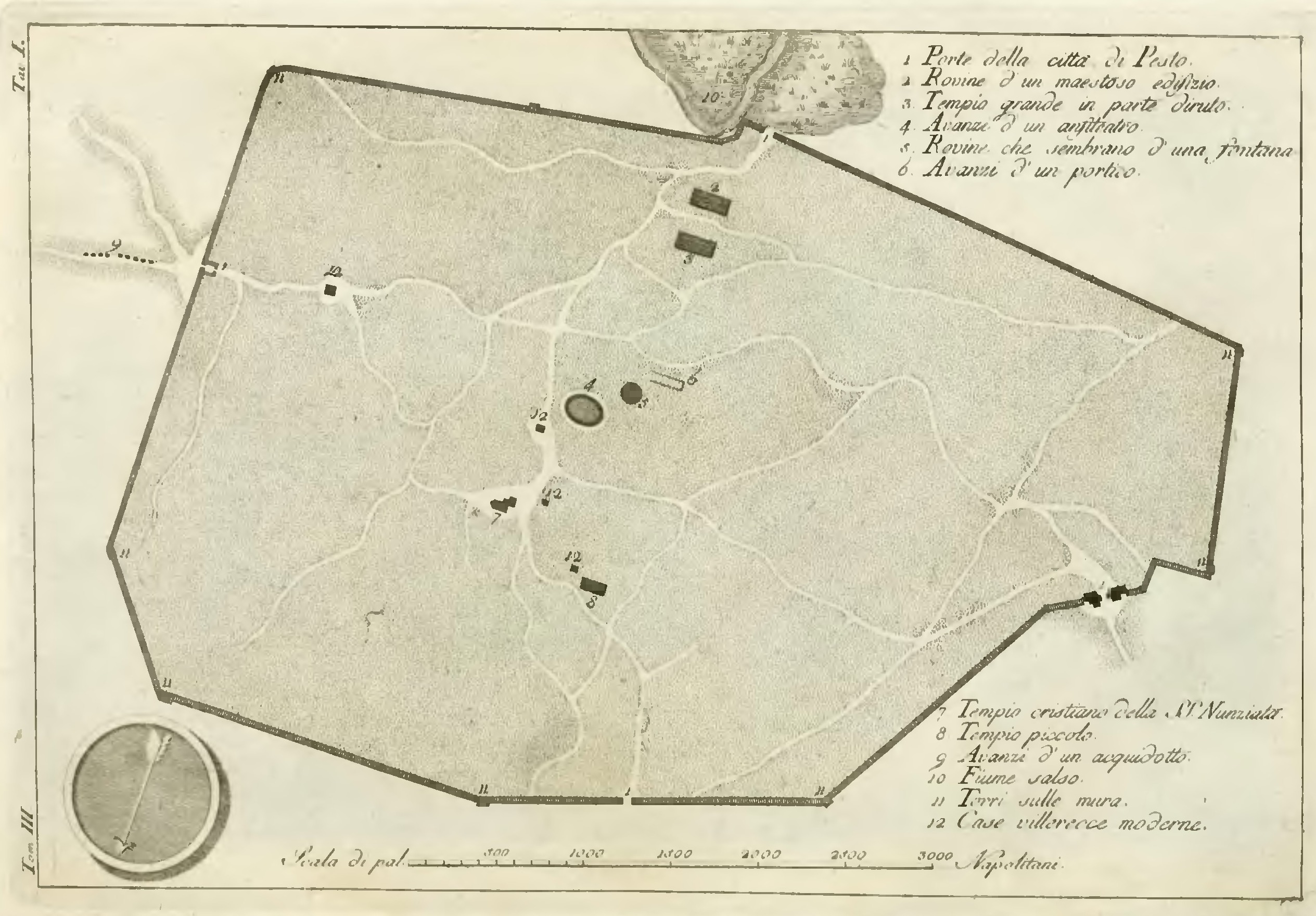
18th century map of Paestum and its walls, with north pointing down

The whole ancient city of Paestum covered an area of approximately 120 hectares. Only the 25 hectares that contain the three main temples and the other main buildings have been excavated. The other 95 hectares remain on private land and have not been studied.

The ancient city was surrounded by defensive walls, which are largely intact. The walls are approximately 4.75 km (3 mi) long in its polygonal perimeter, typically 7 m (23 ft) high, and 5–7 m (16–23 ft) thick. Corresponding with the cardinal points, there were four main openings in the wall: Porta Sirena (east to the hills); Porta Giustizia (south, now to the modern village Paestum); Porta Marina (west to the sea); and Porta Aurea (north), which was later destroyed. Positioned along the wall were 24 square or round towers. There may have been as many as 28, but some of them (and Porta Aurea) were destroyed during the construction of a highway during the 18th century that effectively cut the ancient site in two.

The central area is completely clear of modern buildings and always has been largely so, since the Middle Ages. Although much stone has been stripped from the site, large numbers of buildings remain detectable by their footings or the lower parts of their walls, and the main roads remain paved. A low-built heroon or shrine memorial to an unknown local hero survived intact; the contents are in the museum. Numerous tombs have been excavated outside the walls.

=== The three Greek Temples ===
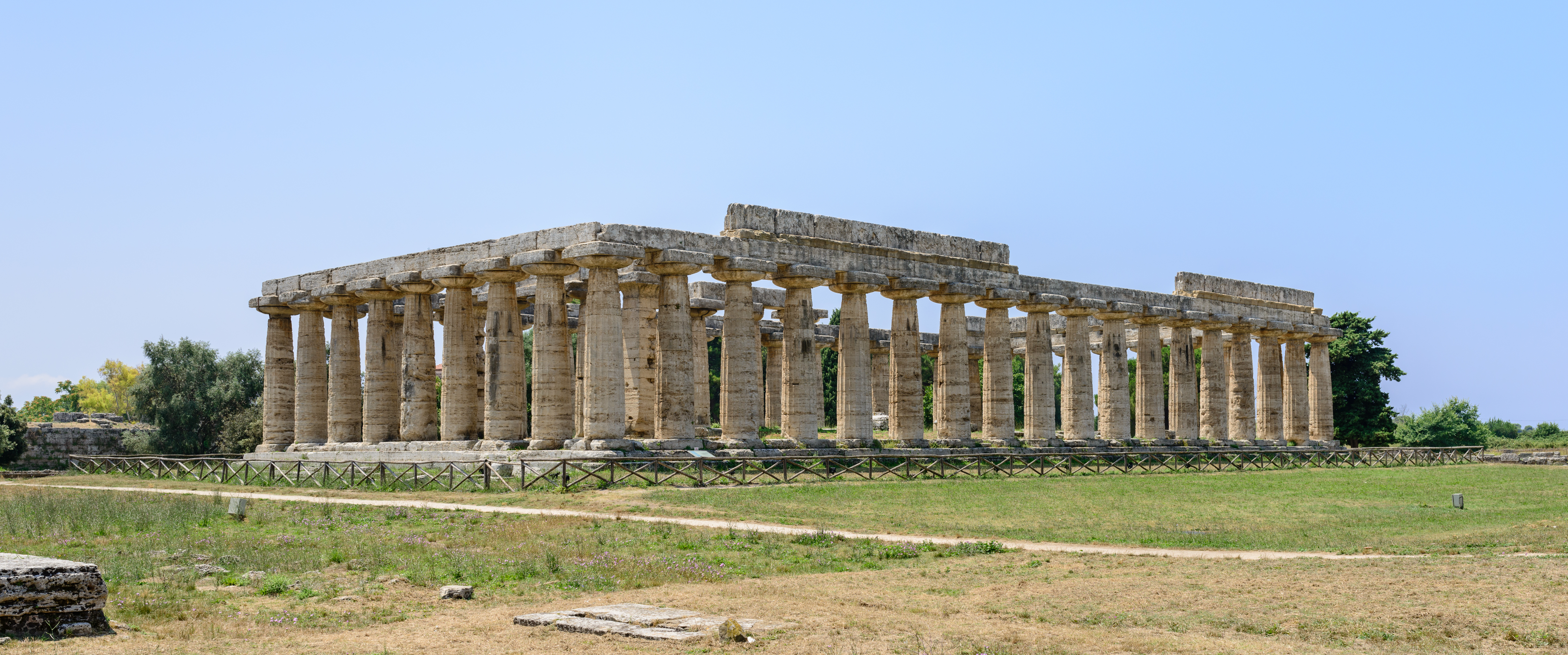
First temple of Hera, c. 550 BCE

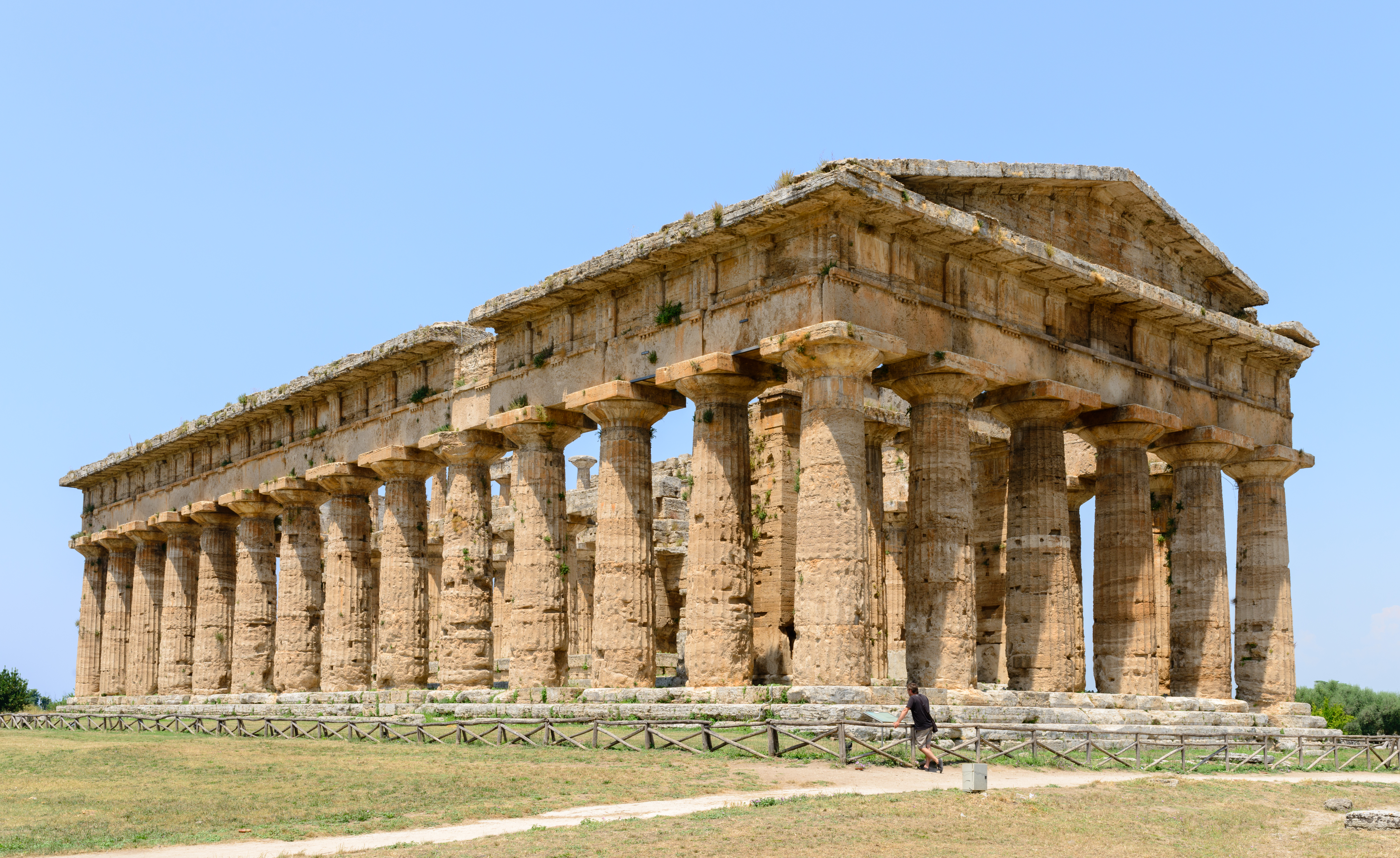
Second temple of Hera, c. 450 BCE

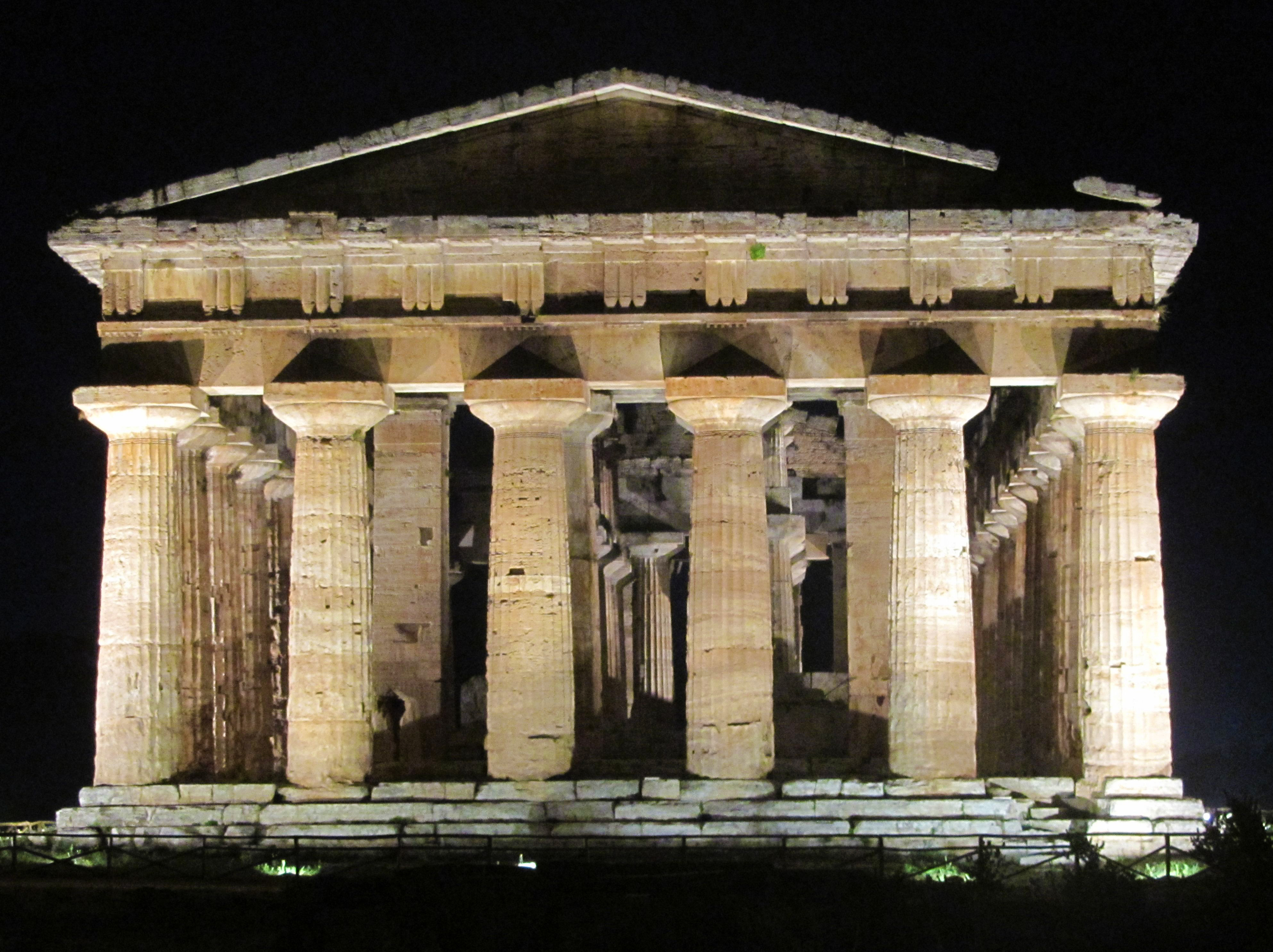
Temple of Hera II at night

The first Temple of Hera, built around 550 BCE by the Greek colonists, is the oldest surviving temple in Paestum and the one farthest south. 18th-century archaeologists named it "the Basilica" because some mistakenly believed it to be a Roman building. (The original Roman basilica was essentially a civic form of building, before the basilica plan was adopted by the Early Christians for churches.)

Inscriptions and terracotta statuettes revealed that the goddess worshiped here was Hera. Later, an altar was unearthed in front of the temple, in the open-air site usual for a Greek altar. The faithful could attend rites and sacrifices without entering the cella or inner sanctuary.

The columns have a very strong entasis or curvature down their length, an indication of an early date of construction. Some of the capitals still retain visible traces of their original paint. The temple is wider than most Greek temples, probably because there are two doors and a row of seven columns running centrally inside the cella, an unusual feature. This may reflect a dual dedication of the temple. Having an odd number of columns, here nine, across the shorter sides also is very unusual; there are eighteen columns along the longer sides. This was possible, or necessary, because of the two doors, so that neither has a view blocked by a column.

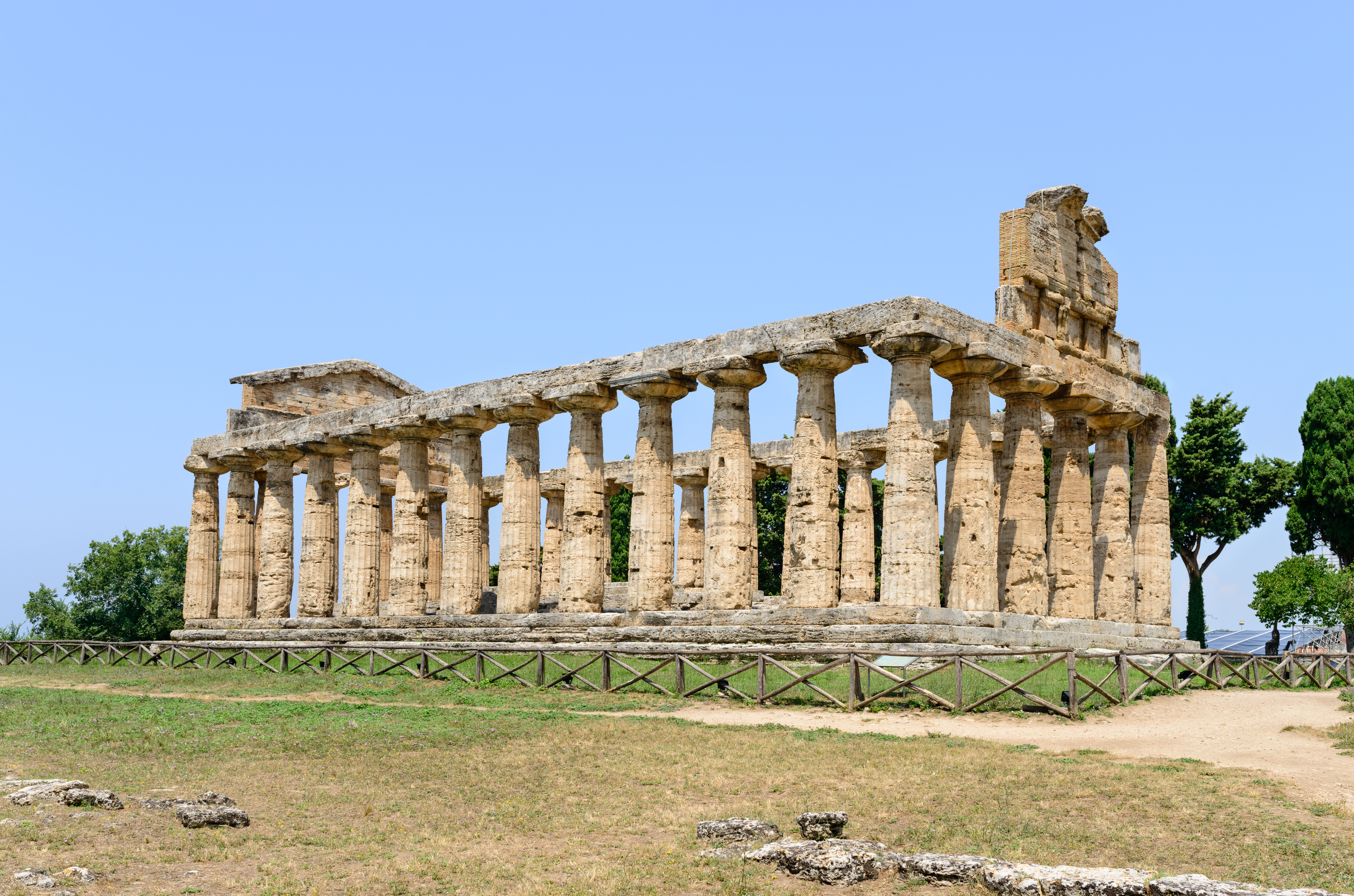
Temple of Athena, c. 500 BCE

On the highest point of the town, some way from the Hera Temples and north of the center of the ancient settlement, is the Temple of Athena. It was built around 500 BCE, and was for some time incorrectly thought to have been dedicated to Ceres. The architecture is transitional, being mainly built in early Doric style and partially Ionic. Three medieval Christian tombs in the floor show that the temple was at one time used as a Christian church.

The second Temple of Hera was built around 460–450 BCE, just north of the first Hera Temple, the two both part of a Heraion, or sanctuary to the goddess. It was once thought to be dedicated to Poseidon, who may have been a secondary focus of worship there. Instead of the typical 20 flutes on each column, they have 24 flutes. The Temple of Hera II also has a wider column size and smaller intervals between columns. The temple was also used to worship Zeus and another deity, whose identity is unknown. There are visible on the east side the remains of two altars, one large and one smaller. The smaller one is a Roman addition, built when a road leading to a Roman forum was cut through the larger one. It also is possible that the temple originally was dedicated to both Hera and Poseidon; some offertory statues found around the larger altar are thought to demonstrate this identification.

External videos
- smARThistory – Ancient Greek Temples at Paestum, Italy

=== Other archaeological features ===
In the central part of the complex is the Roman Forum, thought to have been built on the site of the preceding Greek agora. On the north side of the forum is a small Roman temple, dated to 200 BCE. It was dedicated to the Capitoline Triad, Jupiter, Juno and Minerva.

Between the forum and the temples of Hera and Poseidon, six small temple buildings from the Hellenistic period have been identified.

To the north-east of the forum is the amphitheater. This is of normal Roman pattern, although much smaller than later examples. Only the western half is visible; in 1930 CE, a road was built across the site, burying the eastern half. It is said by local inhabitants that the civil engineer responsible was tried, convicted and received a prison sentence for what was described as wanton destruction of a historic site. There is also a small circular council hall (bouleuterion) or assembly space (ekklesiasterion), with seats in tiers. It was probably never roofed, but had a wall around it, perhaps with a small arcade round the inside. This ceased to have a role in Roman times and was filled over.

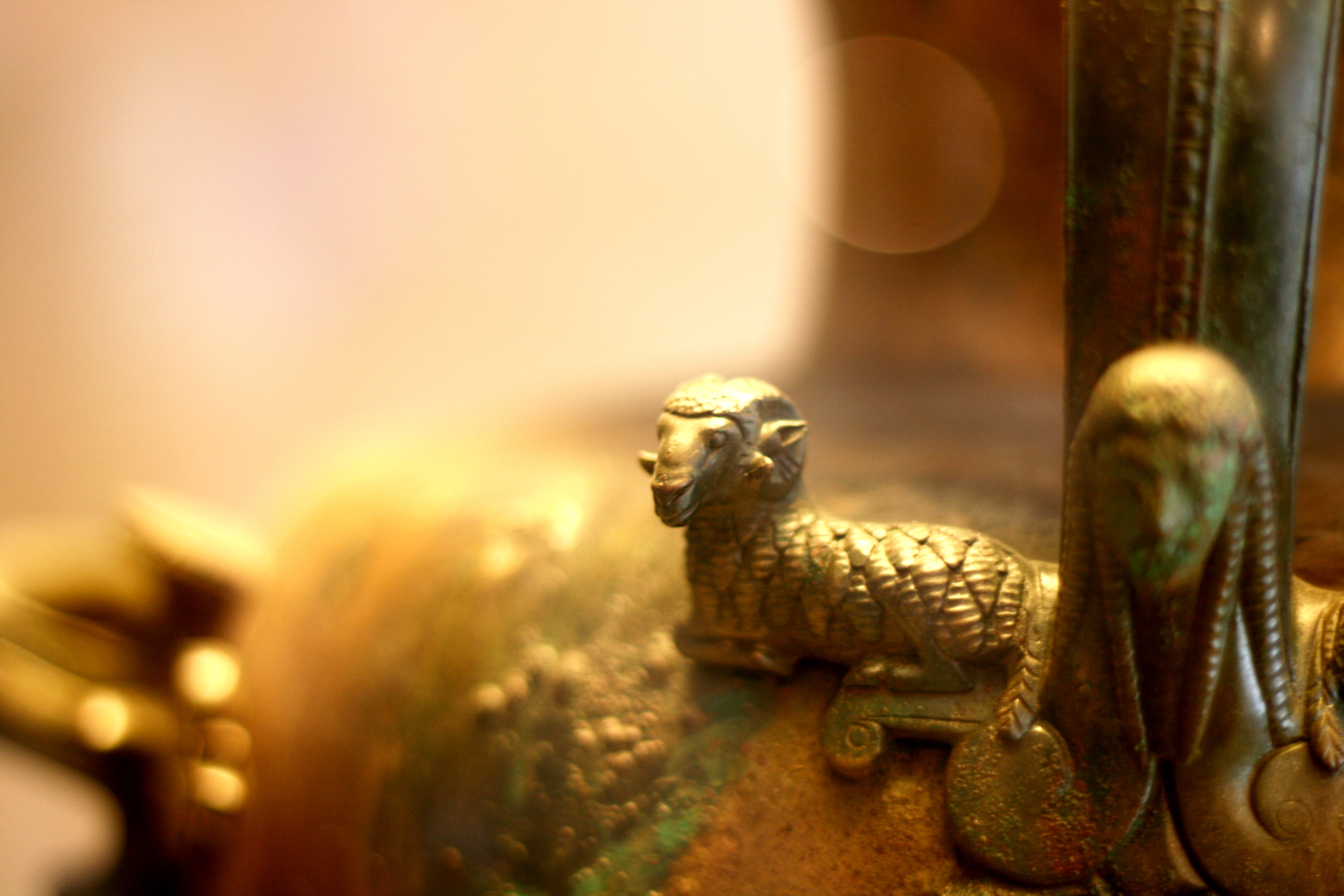
Detail of one of the bronze vessels from the Heroon, in the museum showing a sheep and a woman

The heroön, close to the forum and the Temple of Athena, probably celebrated the founder of the city, though constructed around a century after the death of this unnamed figure. It was a low tumulus with a walled rectangular enclosure faced with large stones around it. When it was excavated in 1954 a low stone chamber with a pitched roof was discovered at the centre, half below the surrounding ground level and half above. This contained several large, rare, and splendid bronze vessels, perhaps not locally made, and a large Athenian pottery black-figure amphora of about 520–500 BCE. The bronze vessels had traces of honey inside. These are all now in the museum.

Just south of the city walls, at a site still called Santa Venera, a series of small terracotta offertory molded statuettes of a standing nude woman wearing the polos headdress of Anatolian and Syrian goddesses, which were dated to the first half of the sixth century BCE, were found in the sanctuary. Other similar ones have been excavated at other Paestum sanctuaries during excavations in the 1980s. The figure is highly unusual in the Western Mediterranean. The open-air temenos was established at the start of Greek occupation: a temple on the site was not built until the early fifth century BCE. A nude goddess is a figure alien to Greek culture before the famous Cnidian Aphrodite by Praxiteles in the fourth century: iconographic analogies must be sought in Phoenician Astarte and the Cypriote Aphrodite. "In places where the Greeks and Phoenicians came in contact with one another, there is often an overlapping in the persona of the two deities."

Inscriptions make clear that during Roman times the cult was reserved to Venus.

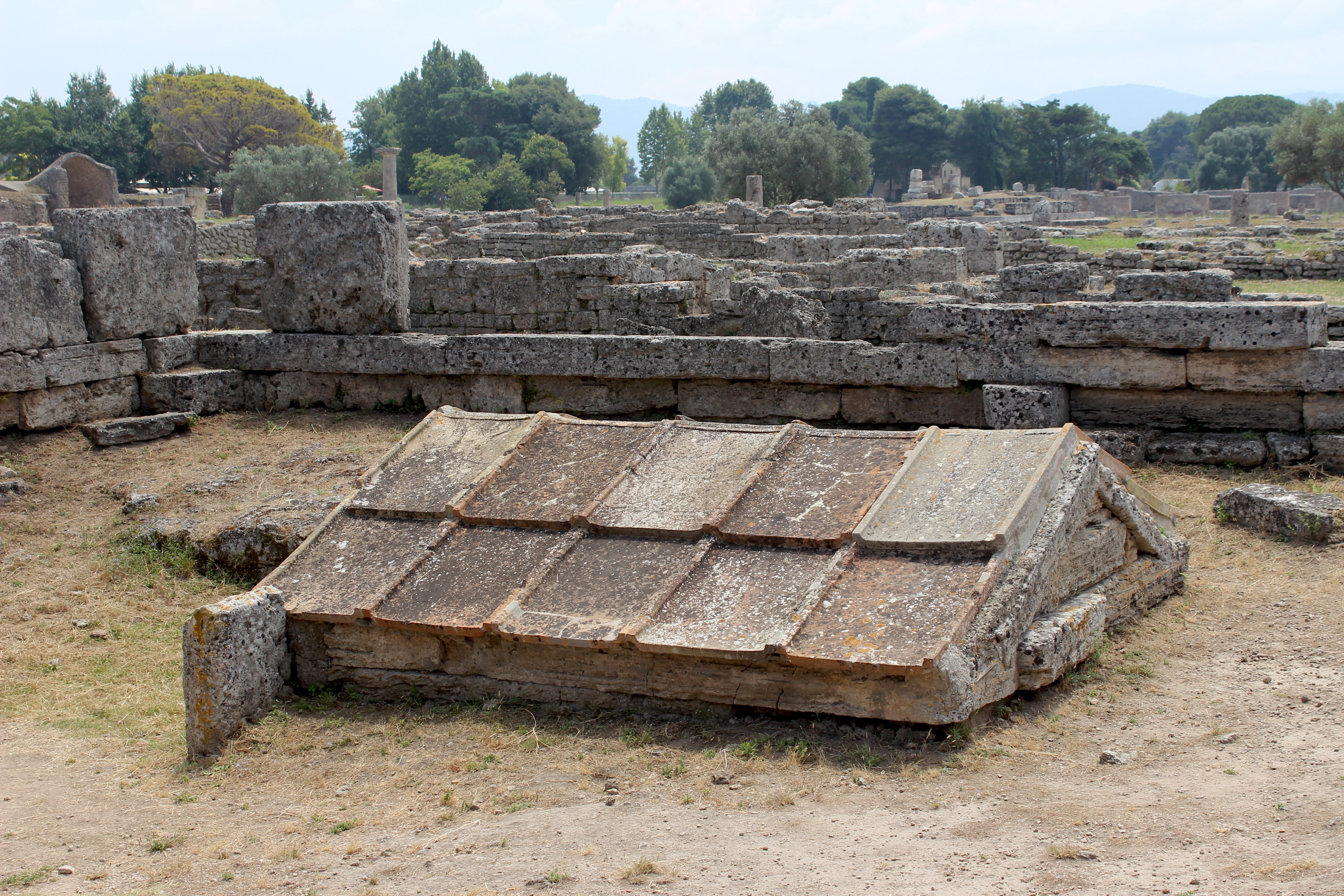
The roof of the heroon chamber, after the tumulus was removed

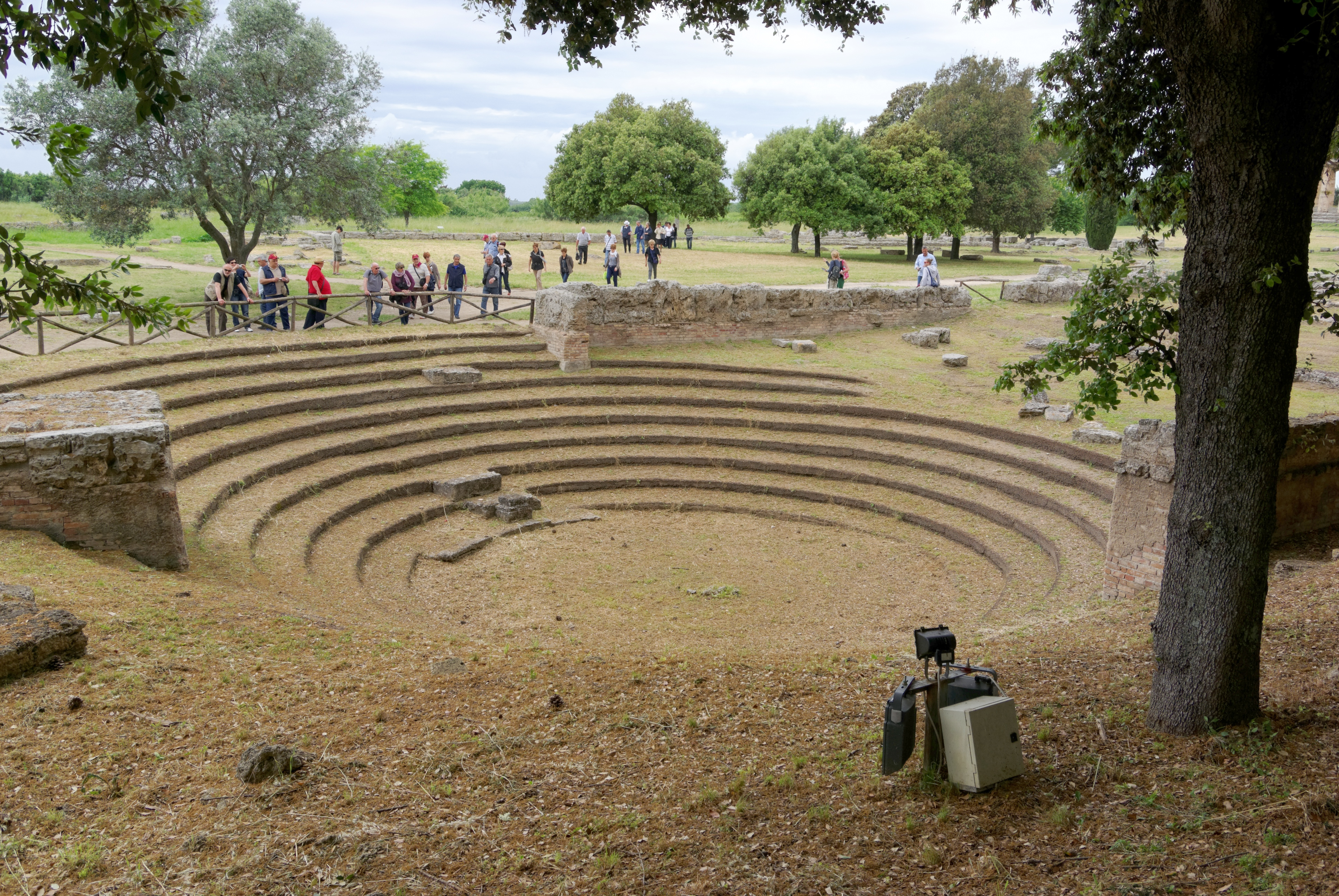
The ekklesiasterion or council chamber

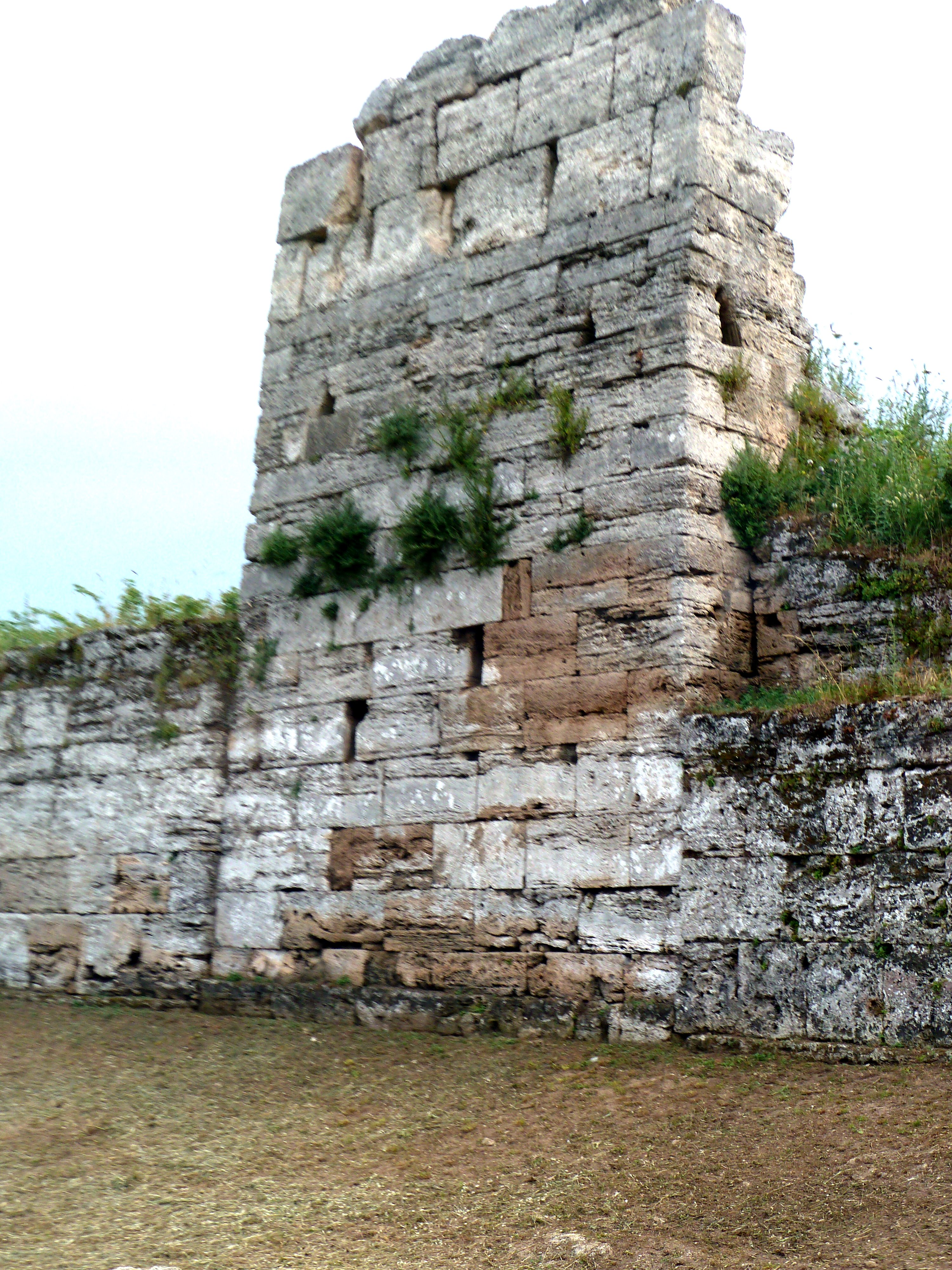
A ruined tower on the city wall

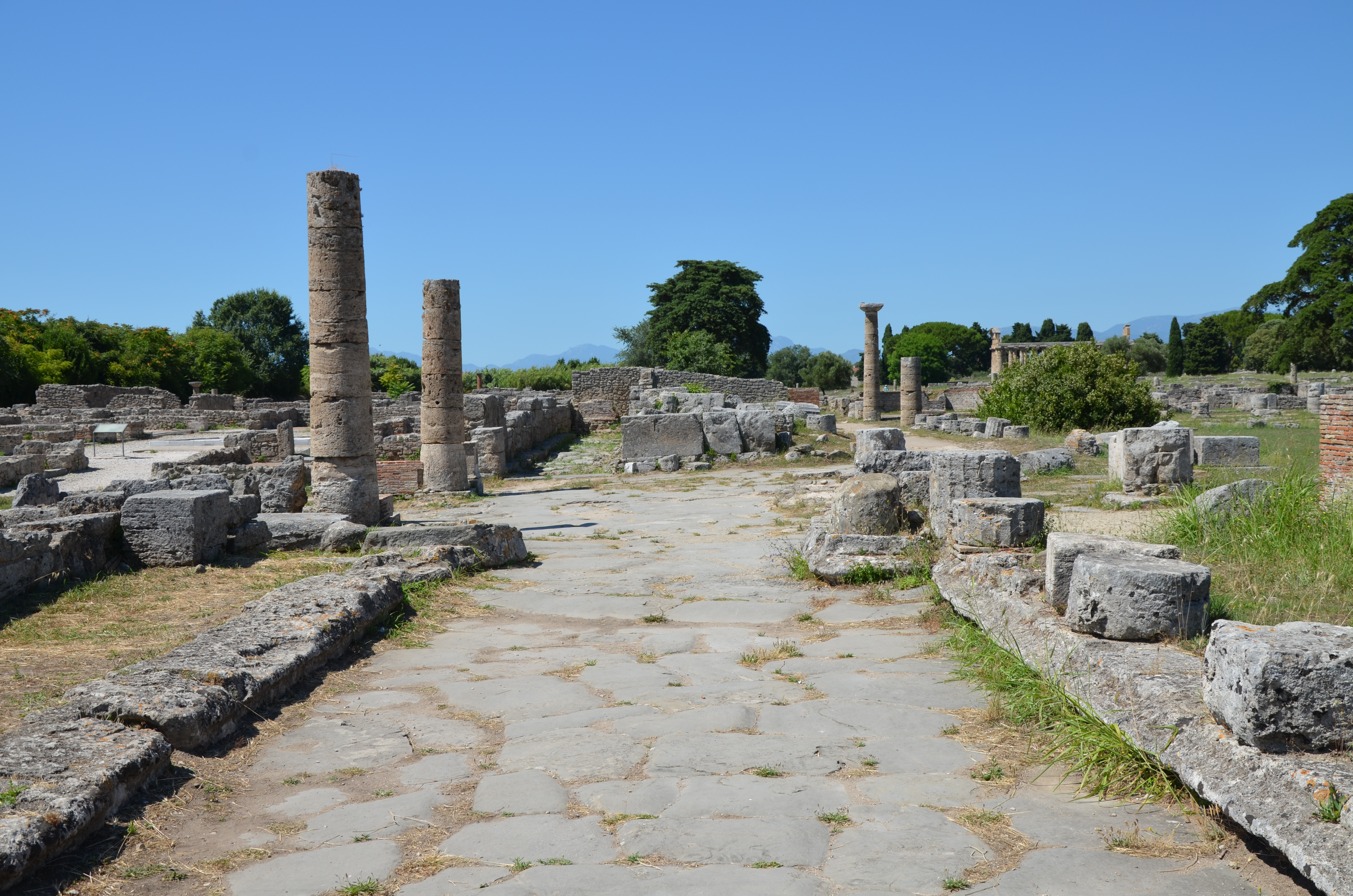
The Via Sacra, main street of the Roman city

=== Painted tombs ===
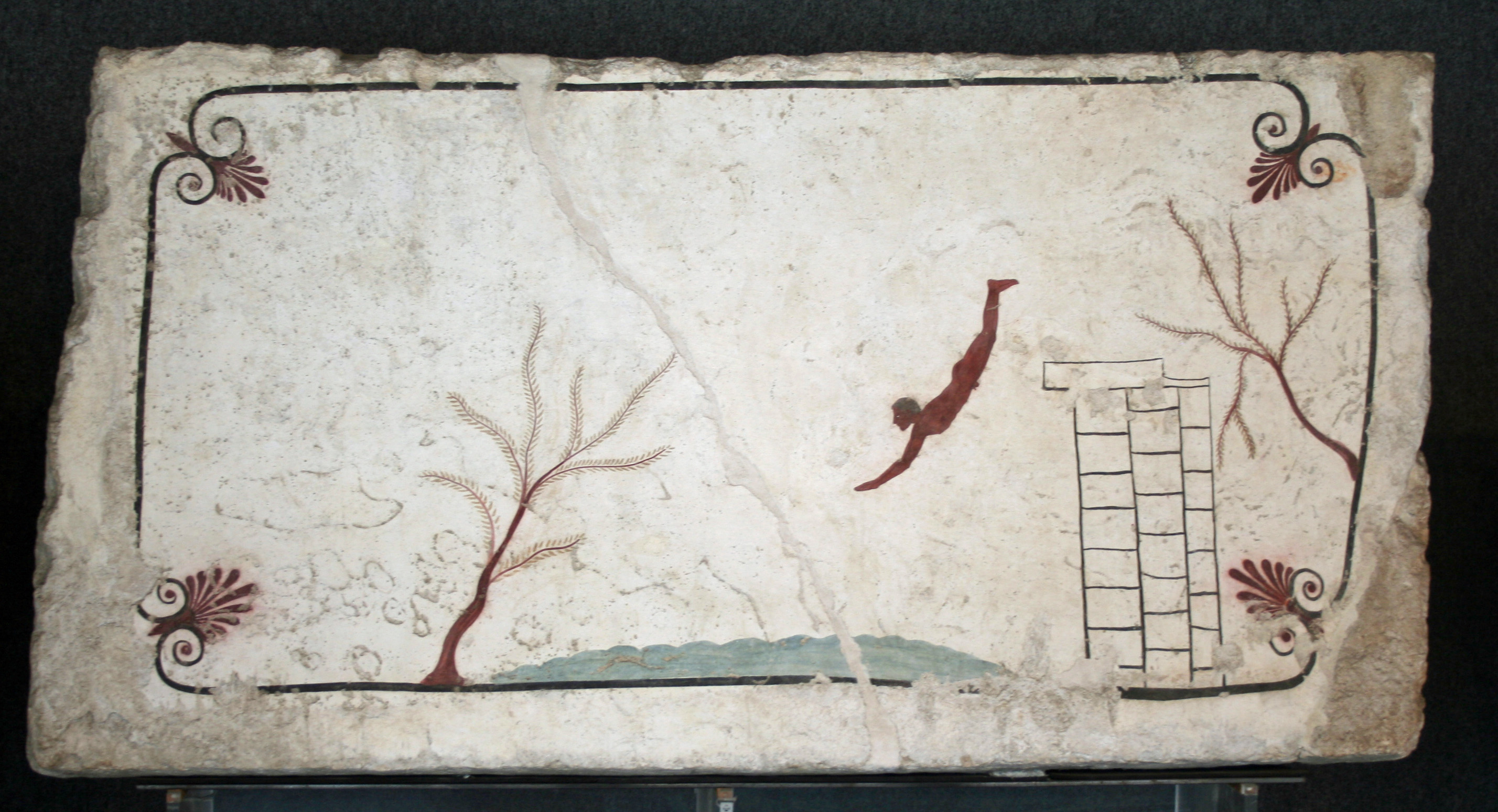
The ceiling of the Tomb of the Diver, c. 470 BCE

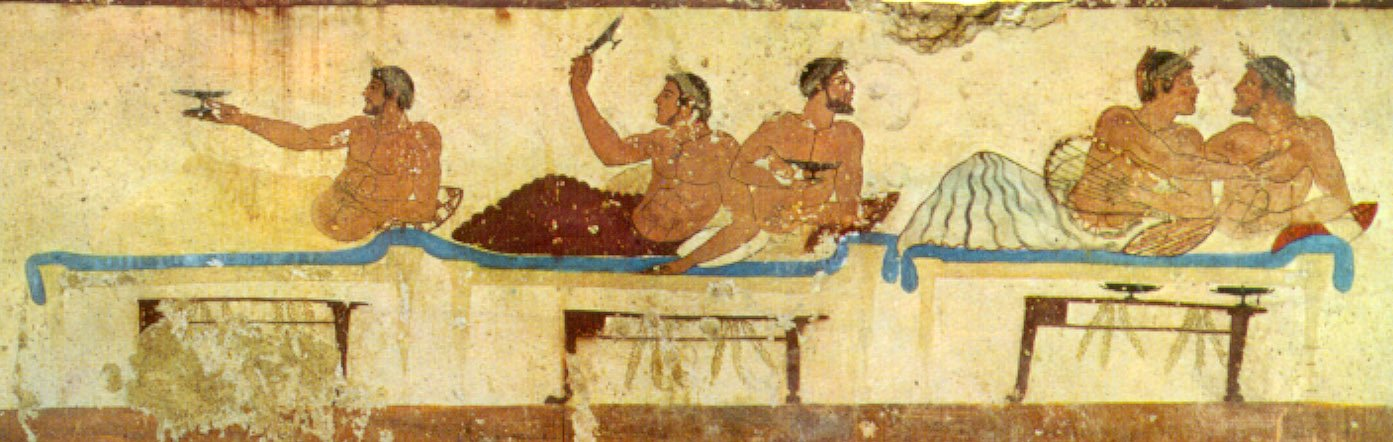
The symposium on the north wall

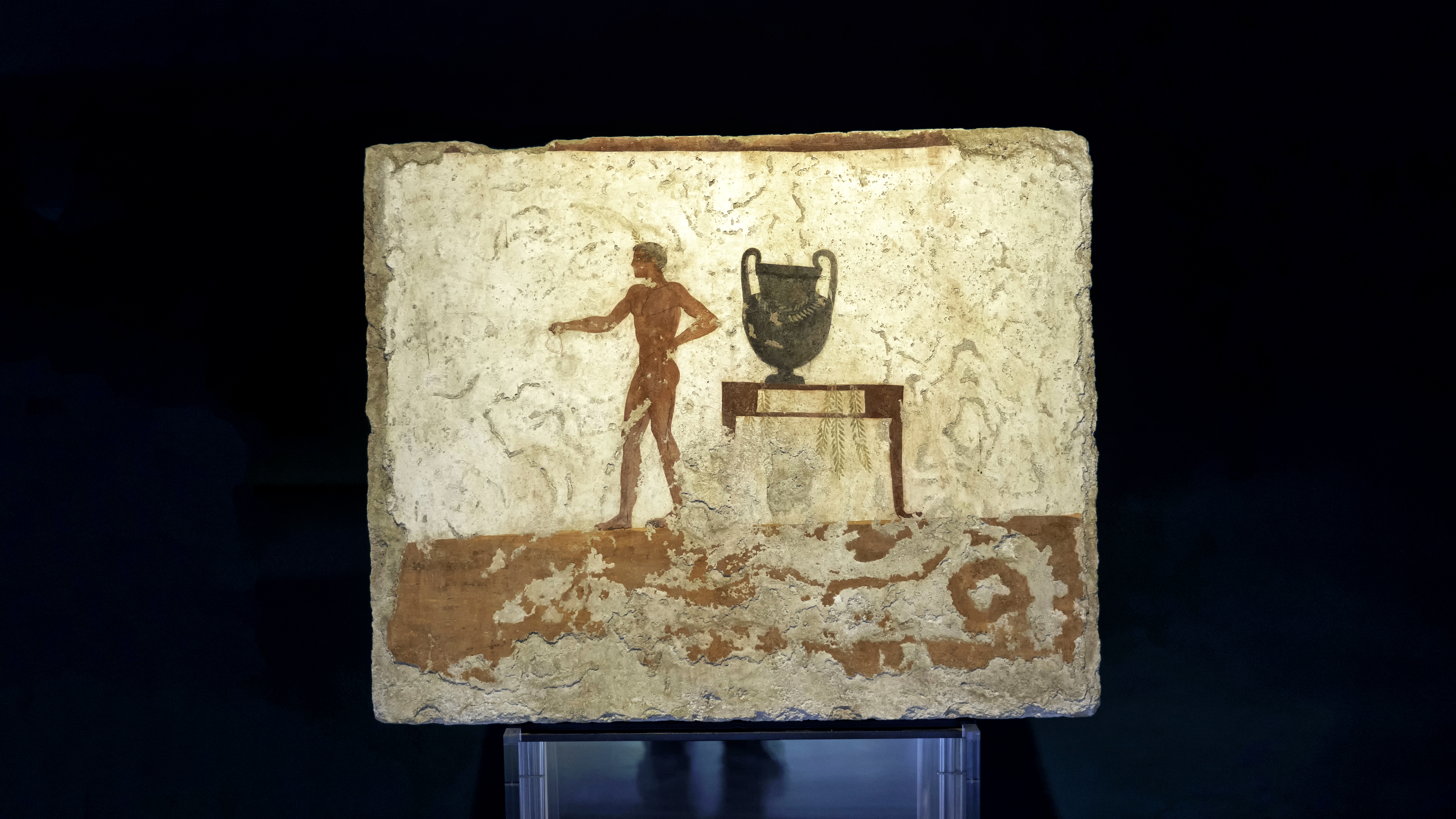

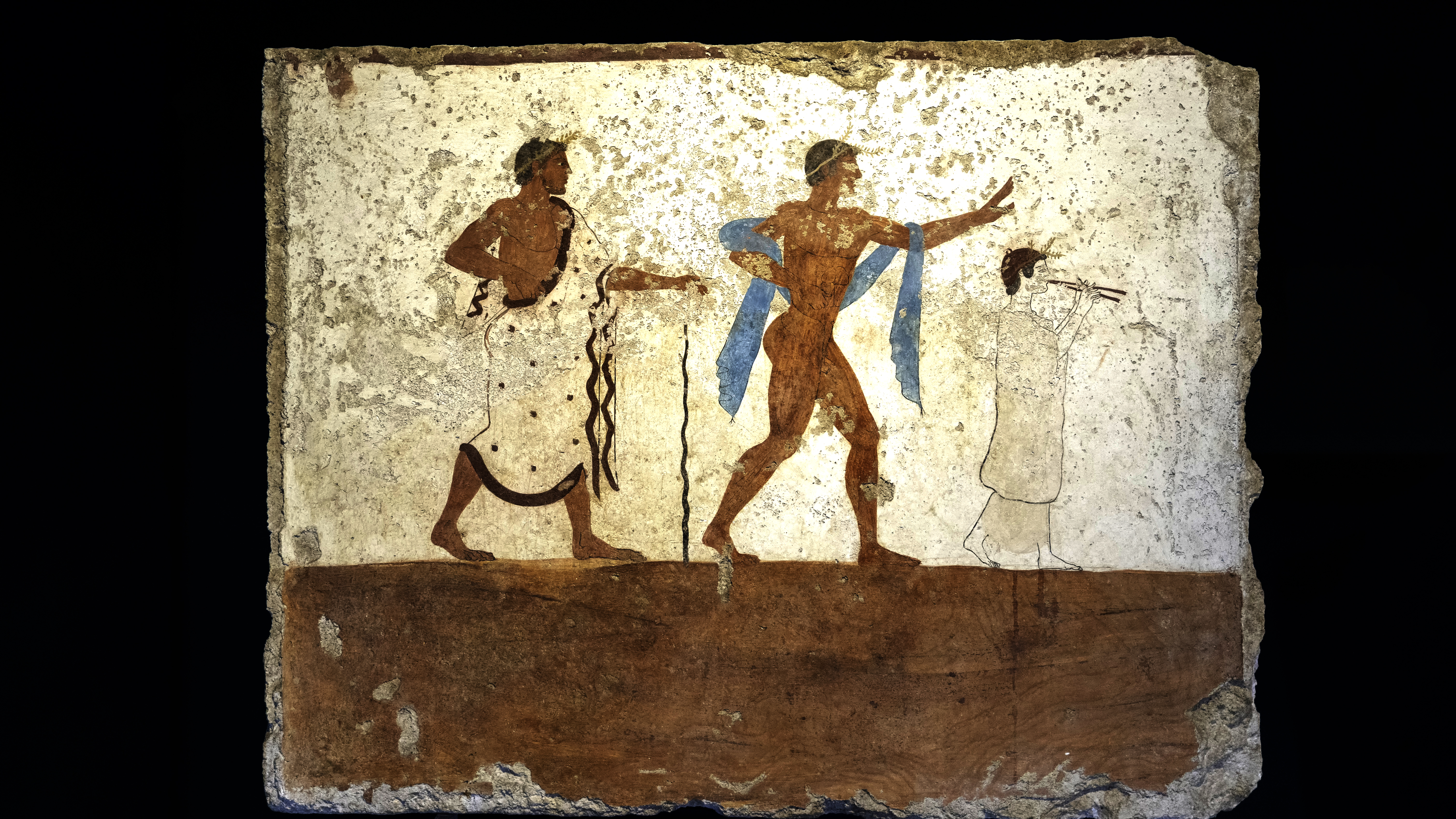

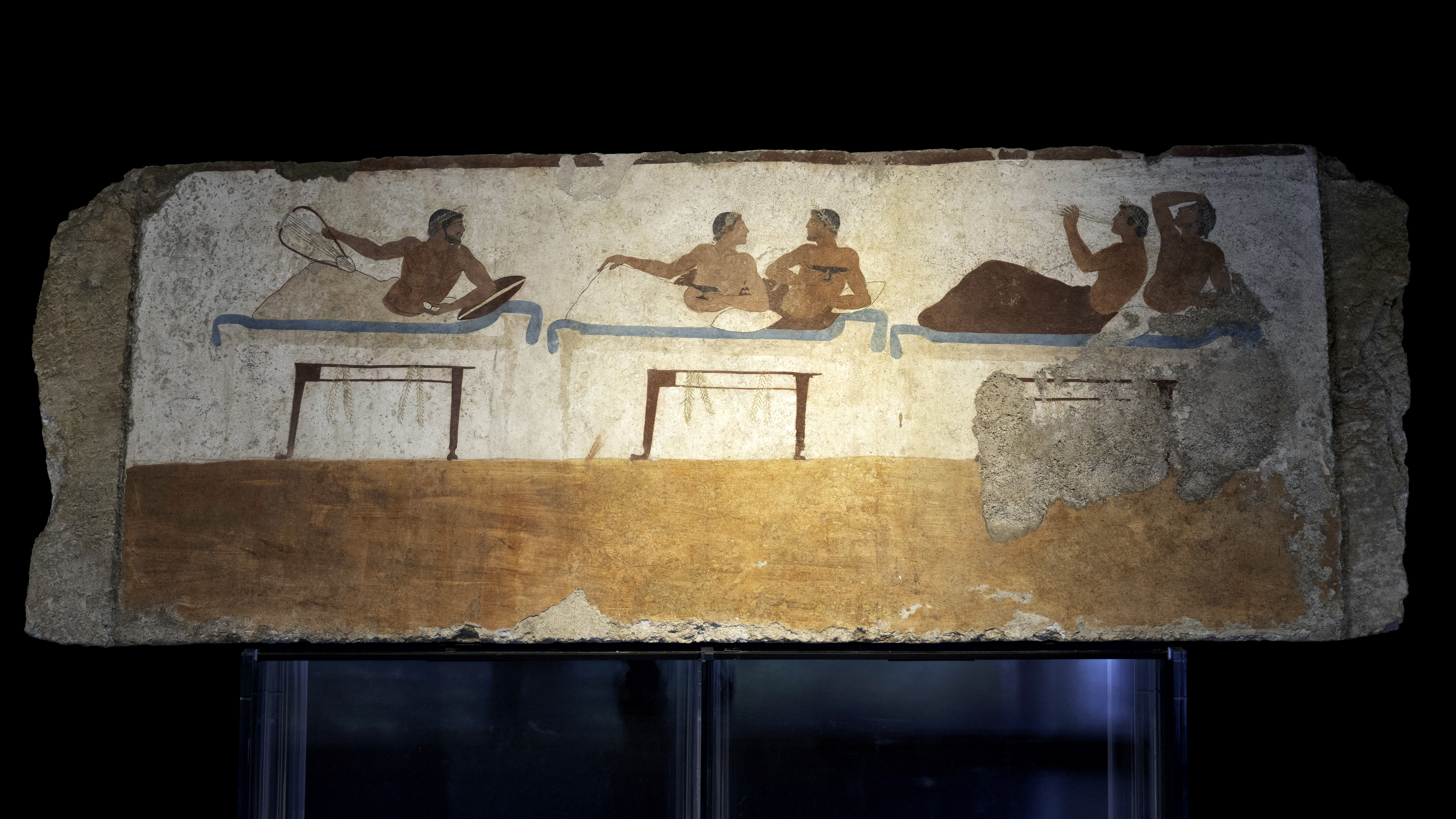

Paestum also is renowned for its painted tombs, mainly belonging to the Lucanian period, while only one of them dates to the Greek period. However, this is the Tomb of the Diver (Italian: Tomba del tuffatore), which is the most famous. It is named after the enigmatic scene, depicted on the underside of the covering slab, of a young man diving into a stream of water. It dates to the first half of the fifth century BCE (about 470 BCE), the Golden Age of the Greek town. It was found, on 3 June 1968, in a small necropolis some 1.5 km south of the ancient walls. The paintings have now been transferred to the museum. The tomb is painted with the true fresco technique and its importance lies in being "the only example of Greek painting with figured scenes dating from the Orientalizing, Archaic, or Classical periods to survive in its entirety. Among the thousands of Greek tombs known from this time (roughly 700–400 BCE), this is the only one found to have been decorated with frescoes of human subjects."

The remaining four walls of the tomb are occupied by symposium-related scenes, an iconography far more familiar from Greek pottery than the diving scene. All the five frescoes are displayed in the museum, together with other cycles from Lucanian painted tombs. In contrast to earlier Greek tomb paintings, these later scenes have many figures and a high proportion of scenes including horses and equestrian sports.

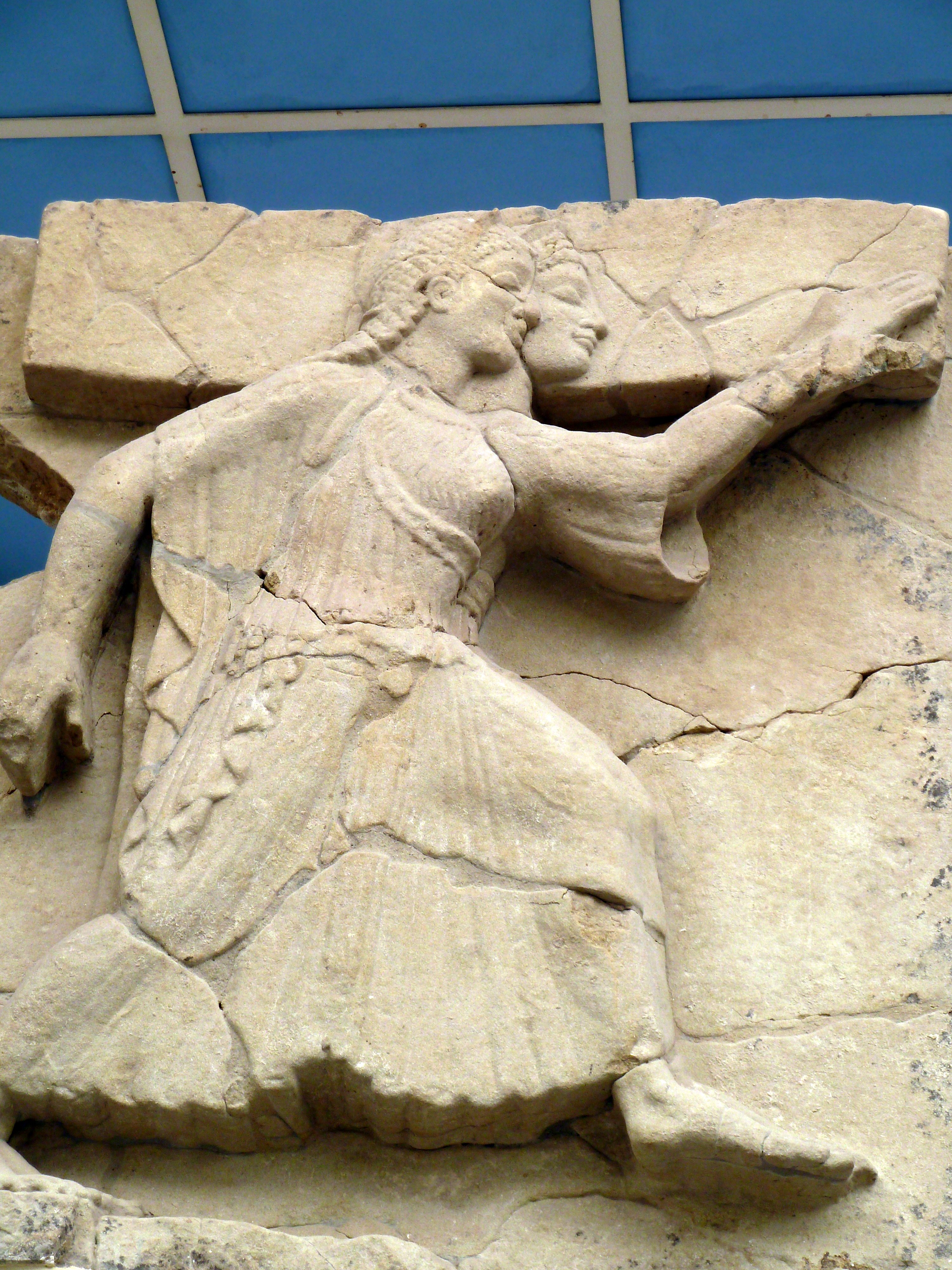
Sele metope, two women running, c. 510 BCE

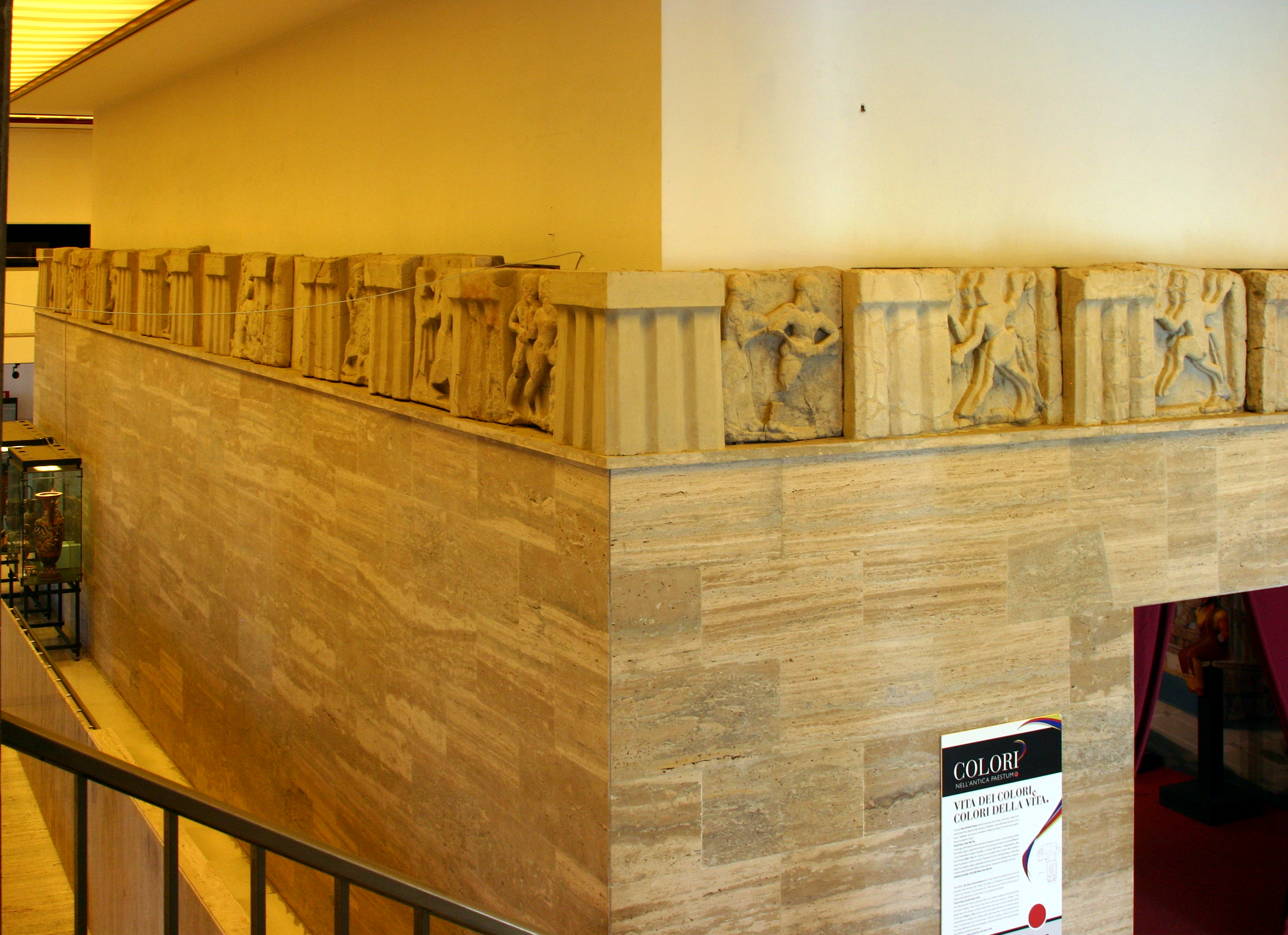
The Sele metopes as displayed in the Paestum museum

=== Sele complex ===
A few kilometres from Paestum there was a temple complex at the mouth of the Sele river (Foce del Sele in Italian) dedicated to Hera. The temple is now all but destroyed, and little remains of several other buildings. About 70 of the sixth-century BCE Archaic metope relief panels on the temple and another building at the site were recovered, however. These fall into two groups, the earlier of which shows the story of the life of Heracles in 38 surviving reliefs; the later group, of about 510 BCE, shows pairs of running women. The earlier cycle forms the centrepiece of the Paestum museum, set in place around walls of the original height. At the site there is a museo narrante with video displays, but no original artefacts.

=== Art from Paestum ===
The National Archaeological Museum of Paestum holds the largest collection, but many significant pieces were removed from the site before modern controls and are in a number of collections around the world. The National Archaeological Museum of Spain in Madrid has especially rich holdings, with two important Imperial Roman statues and many, very fine vases (see below). Other pieces, mostly painted pottery, are in the Louvre, the Antikensammlung Berlin, and other museums in Europe and America.

In the case of painted pottery, a number of individual artists, especially from the fourth century BCE, have been identified and given notnames whose work has been found in tombs around the city and the region, and sometimes farther afield. It has been presumed that these artists were based in the city.

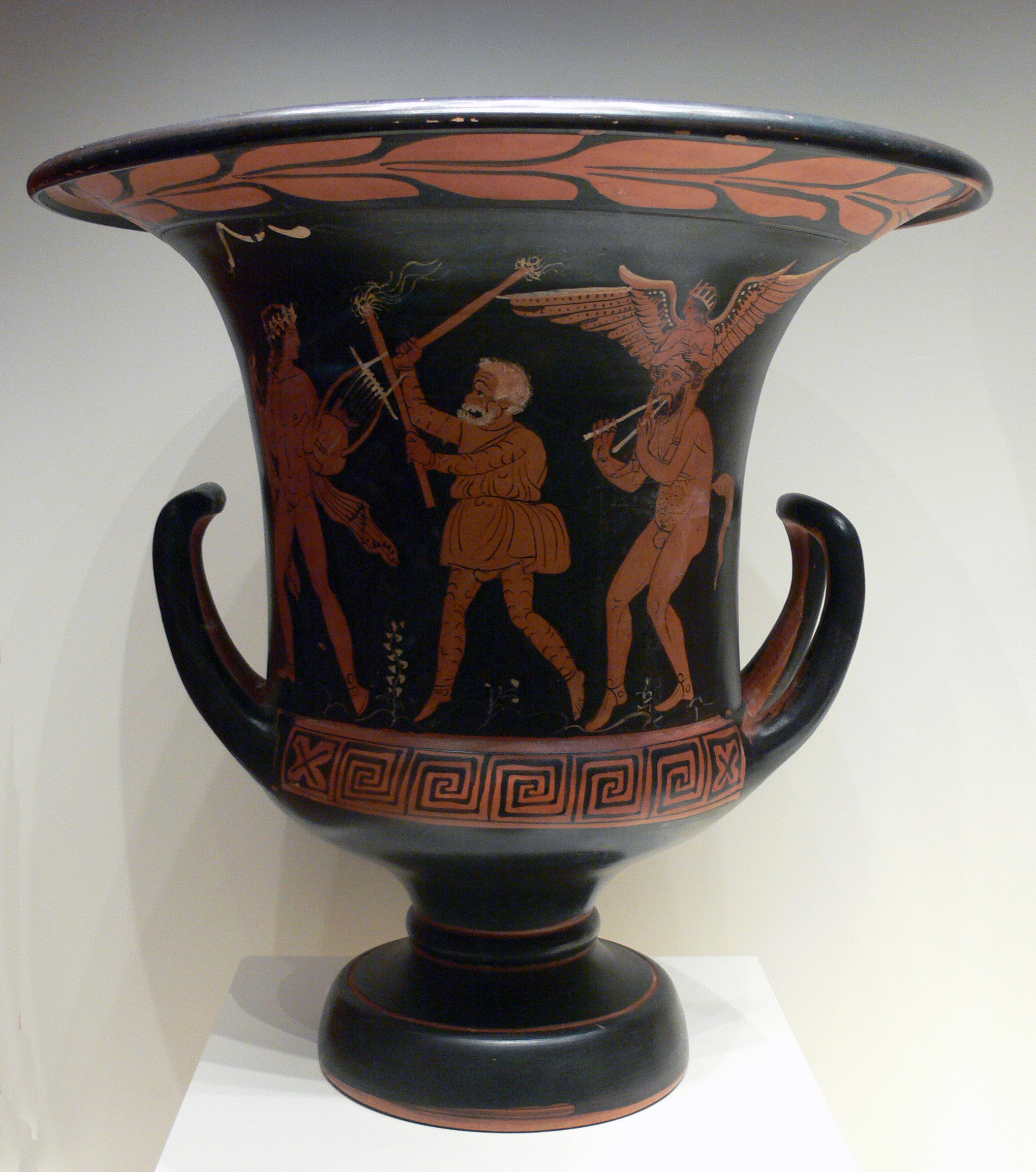
Krater of about 360 BCE, now Getty Villa, California

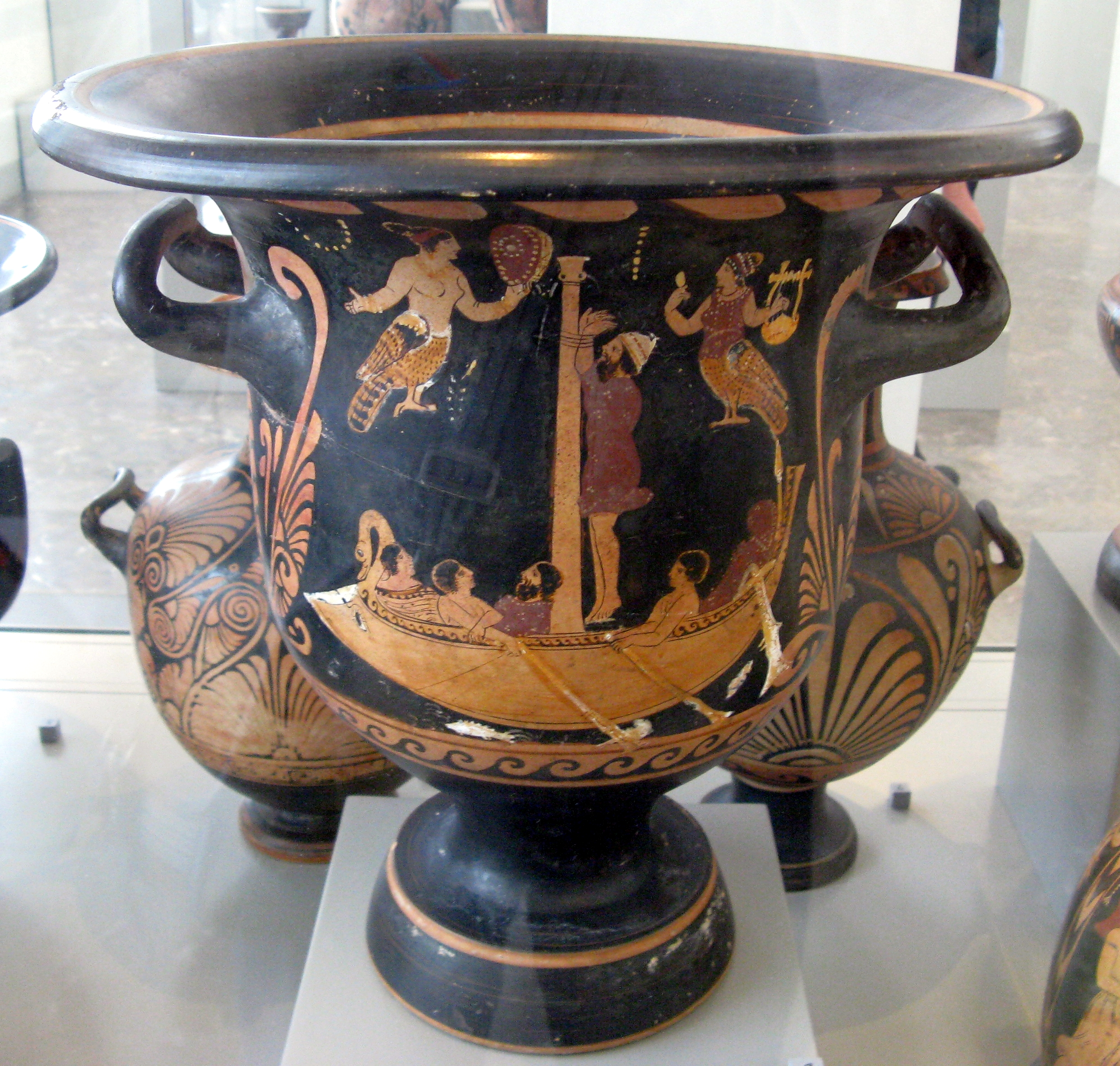
Odysseus and the Sirens on a Paestum bell krater, painted by Python, c. 330 BCE, now at the Antikensammlung Berlin

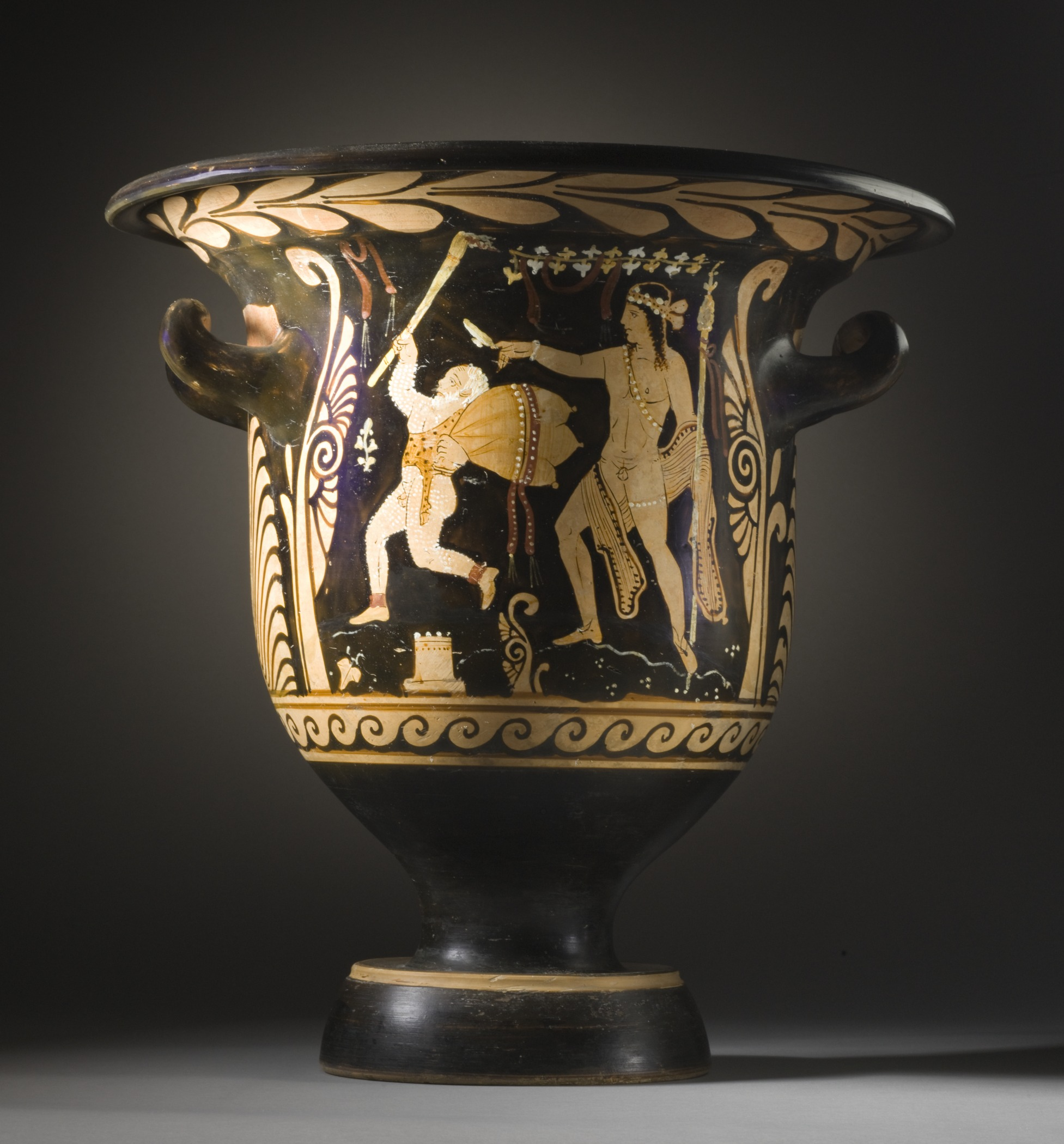
Bell krater with an elderly satyr followed by young Dionysos, by Python, c. 350–325 BCE, Los Angeles County Museum of Art

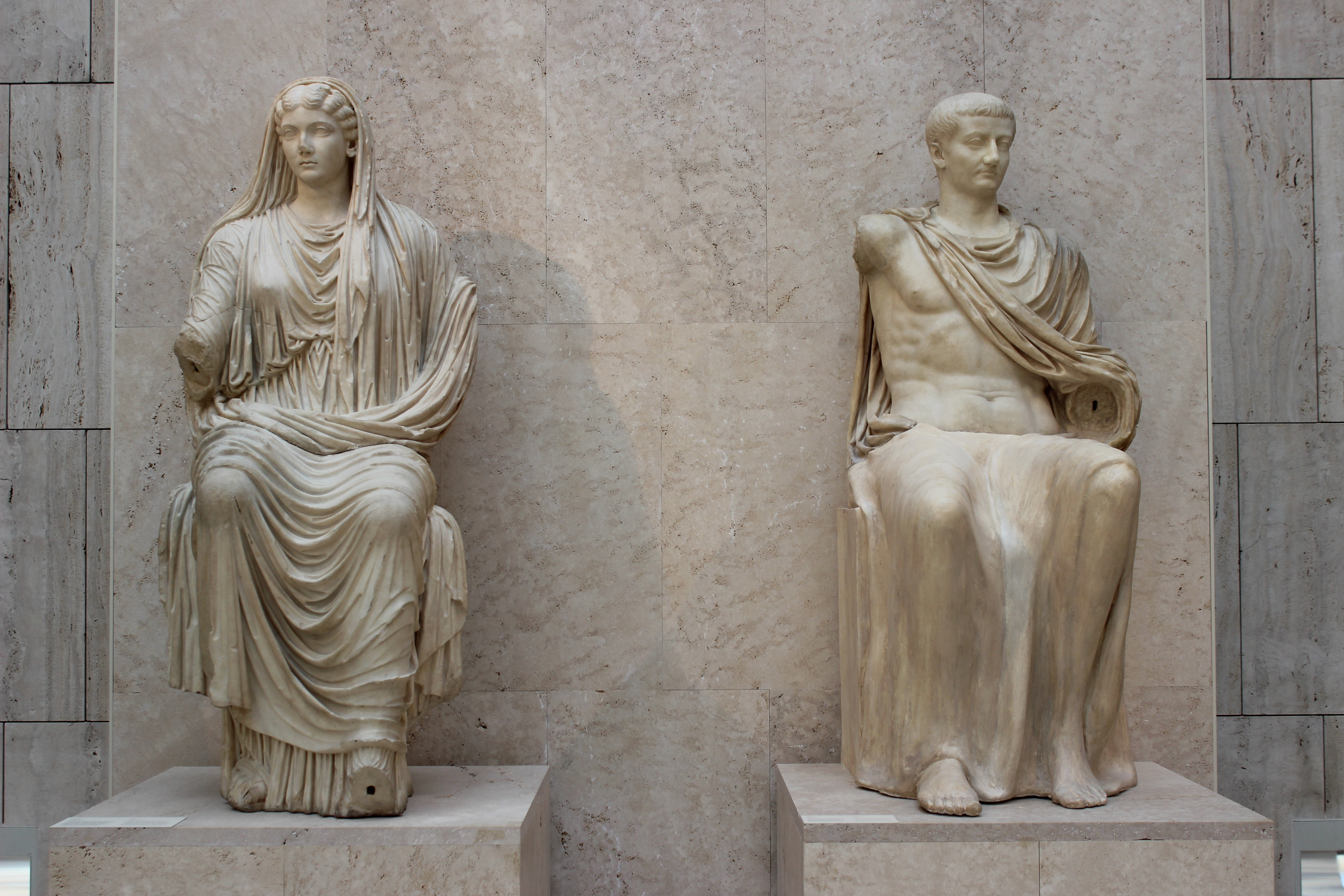
Statues of Livia and Tiberius, c. 30 CE, now in the National Archaeological Museum of Spain

=== National Archaeological Museum ===
The highlights of the National Archaeological Museum of Paestum are mentioned above: the Sele metopes, the Tomb of the Diver, and the contents of the Heroon. The displays also show a number of large painted terracotta architectural fragments from the temples and other buildings, many Greek terracotta figurines, and incomplete larger terracotta statues, and pottery including painted vases.

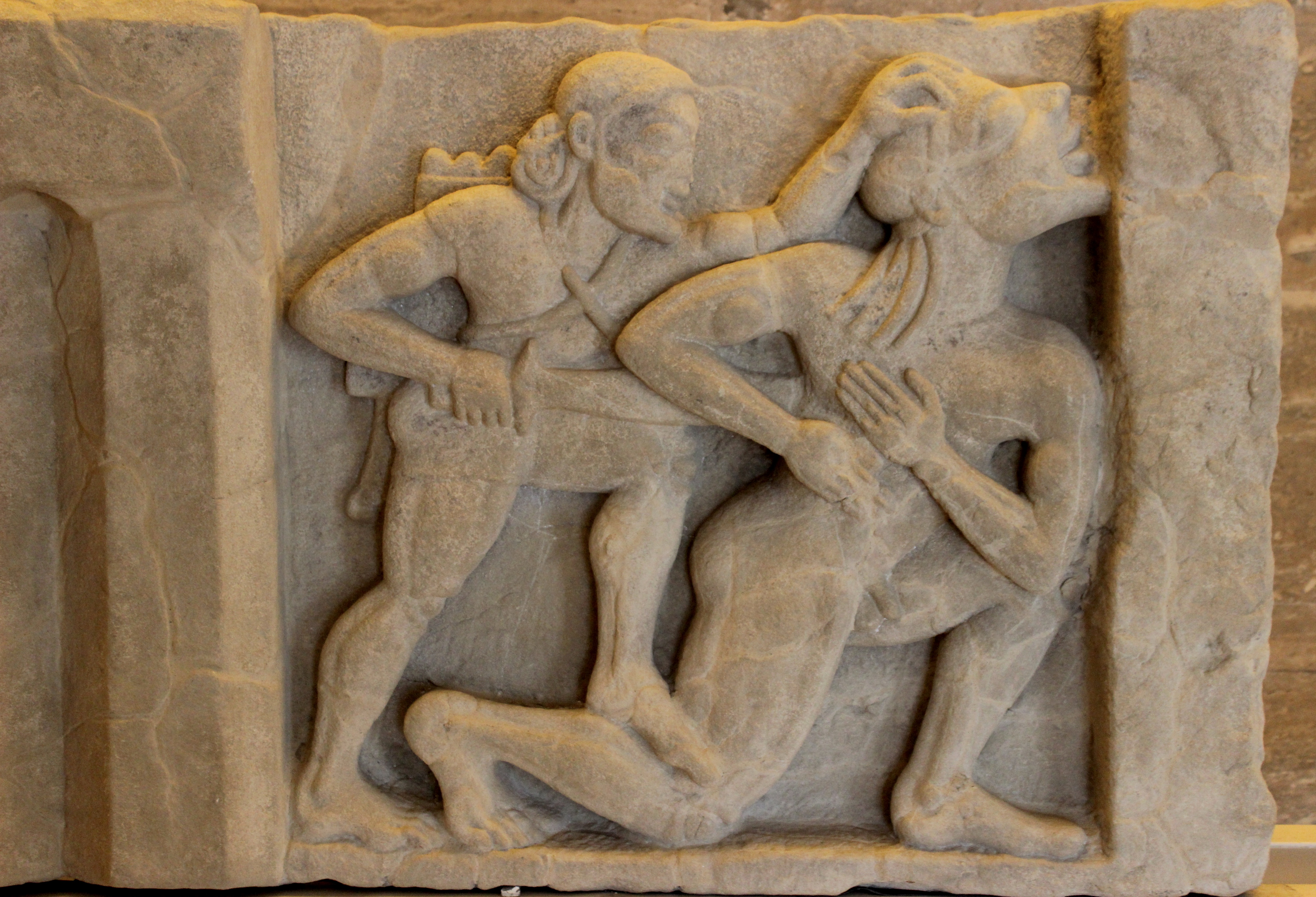
Sele metope with Heracles killing the giant Alcyoneus, 6th century BCE

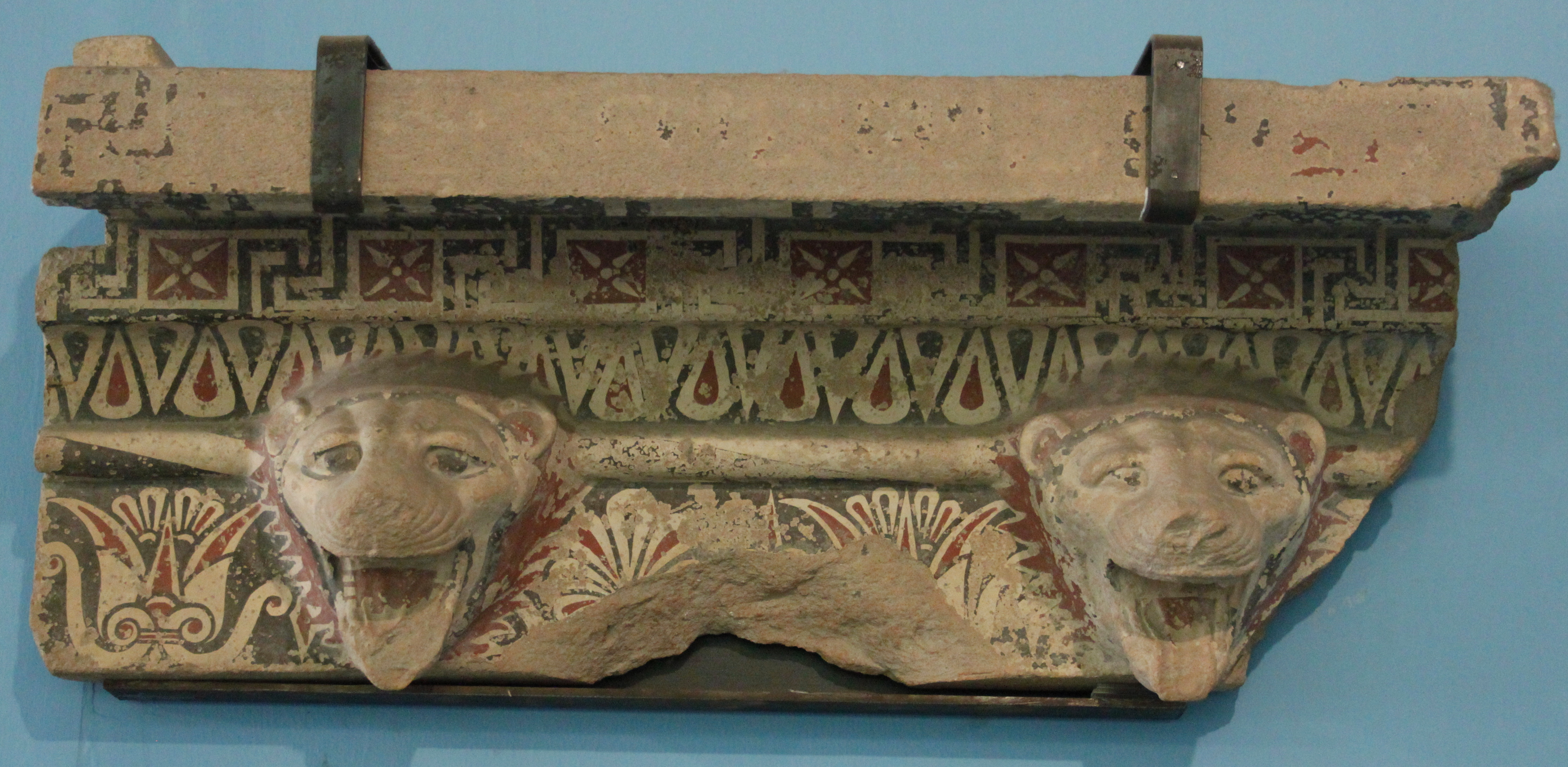
Heads of lionesses in polychromed terracotta finish, Temple of Hera, second half of the 6th century BCE

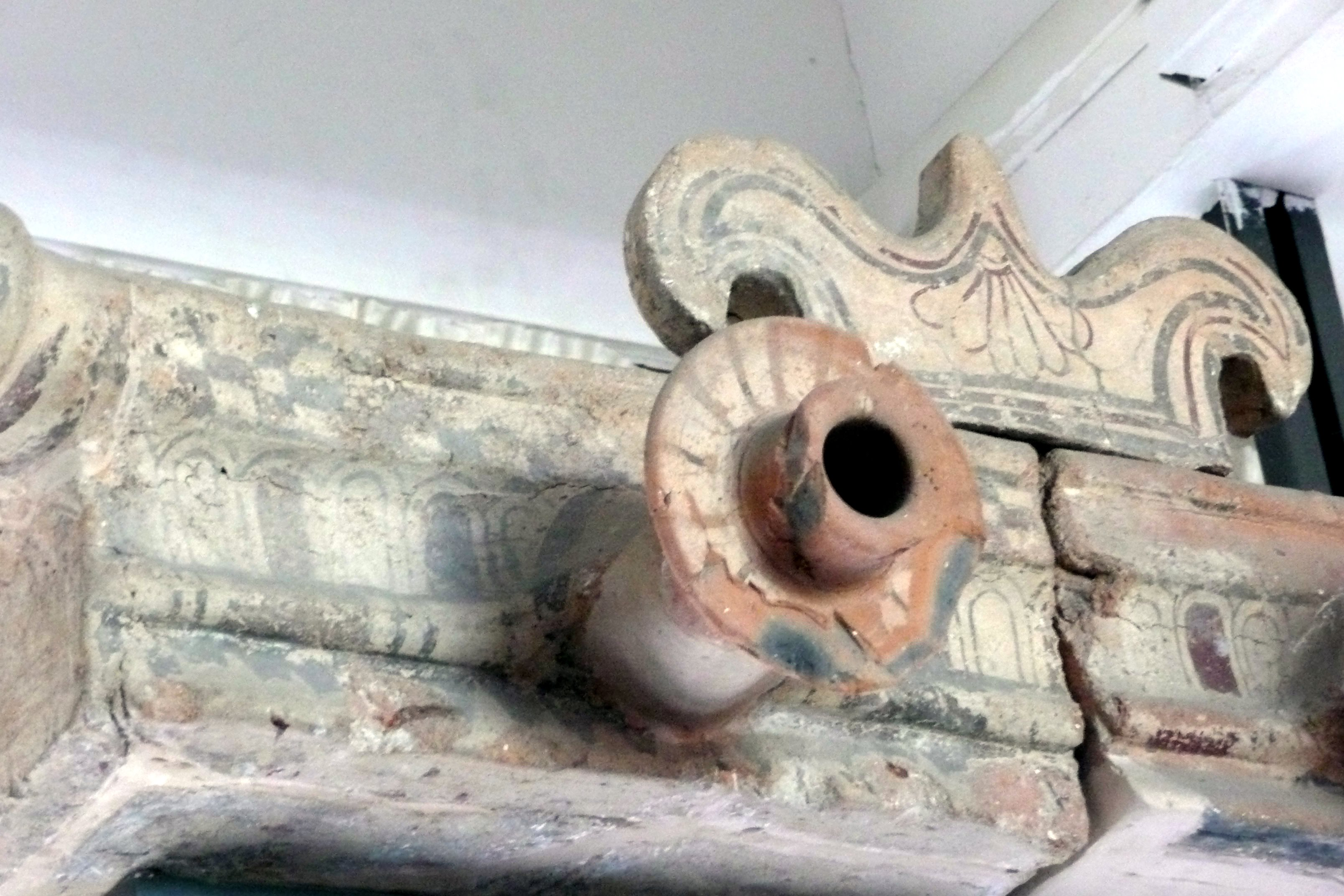
Painted terracotta from the Temple of Athena, c. 500 BCE

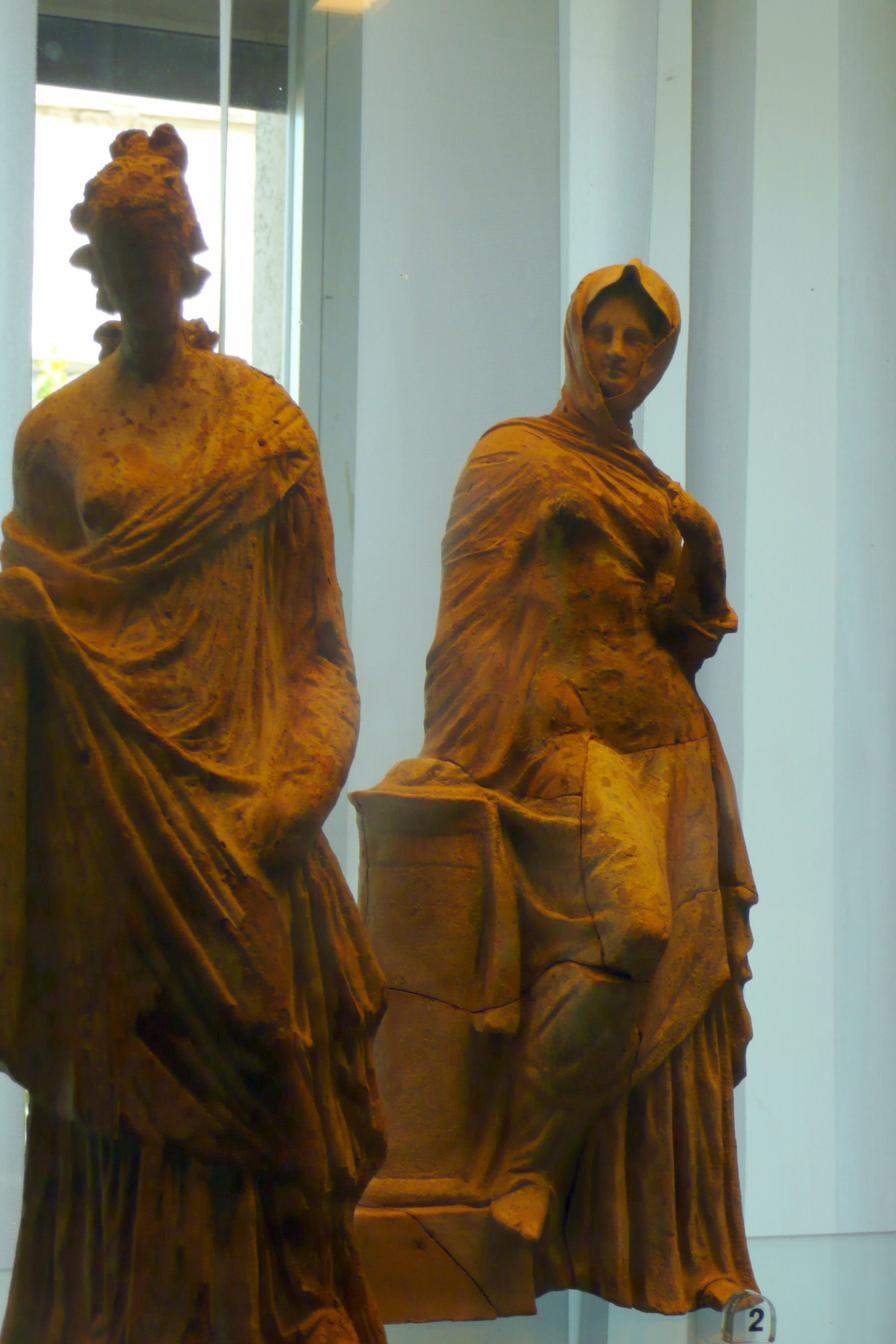
Hellenistic Greek terracotta figurines

== History ==
=== Foundation ===
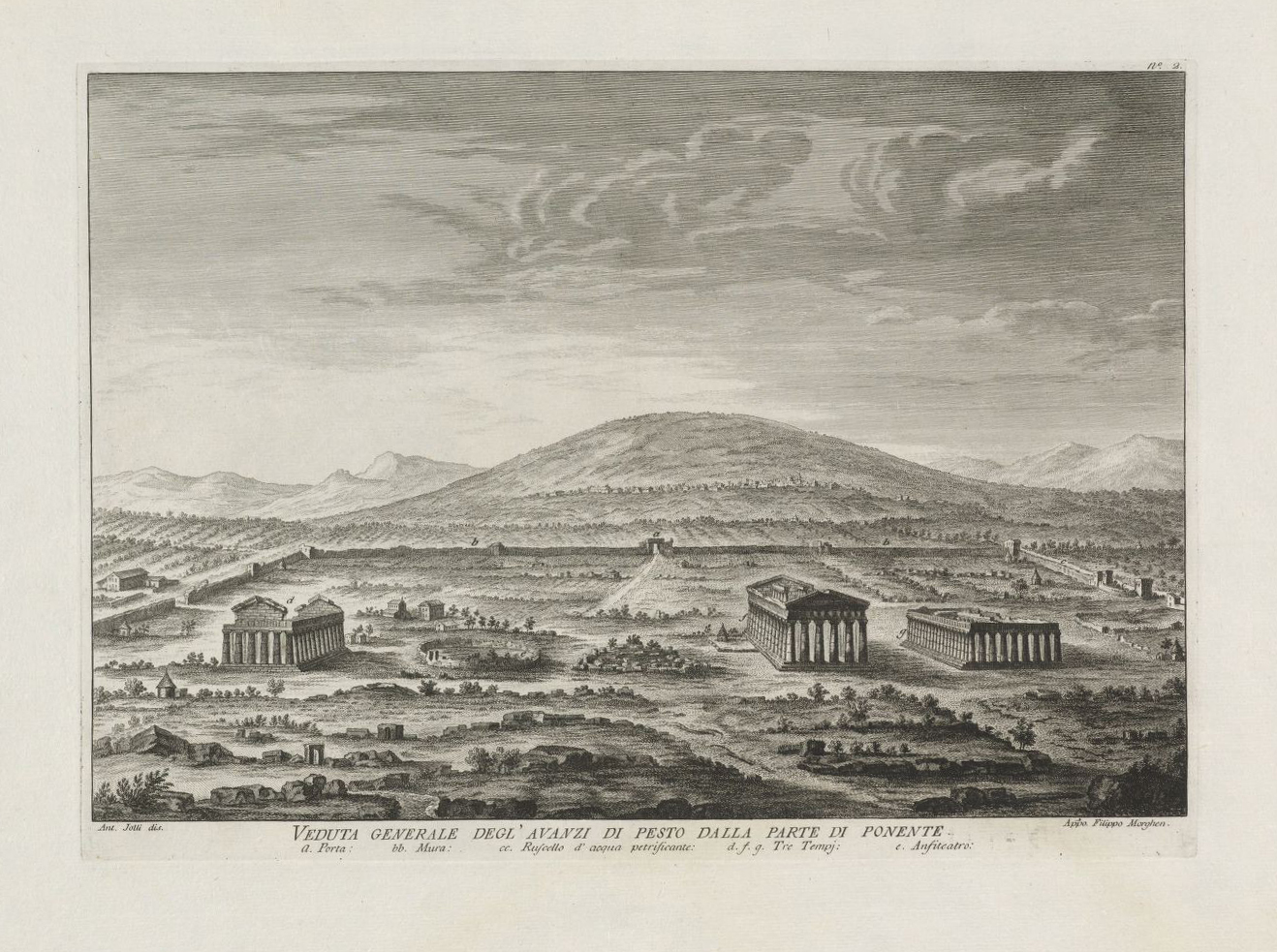
Overview of Paestum, 1769

According to Strabo, the city was founded as Poseidonia (named after the Greek deity of the sea) by Greek Achaeans from Sybaris. The colonists had built fortifications close to the sea, but then decided to found the city farther inland at a higher elevation. Solinus wrote that it was established by Dorians. The fortifications might have been built to the south of Poseidonia on the promontory where Agropoli is now. According to the historical tradition the sanctuary to Poseidon was located there, after which the city would have been named. The date of Poseidonia's founding is not given by ancient sources, but the archaeological evidence gives a date of approximately 600 BCE.

Alternatively in fact, the Sybarites may have been Troezenians. Aristotle wrote that a group of Troezenians was expelled from Sybaris by the Achaeans after their joint founding of that city. Gaius Julius Solinus calls Paestum a Dorian colony and Strabo mentions that Troezen once was called Poseidonia. As a consequence it has been argued that Paestum was founded by the Troezenians referred to by Aristotle. Another hypothesis is that the Sybarites were aided by Dorians in their founding of Poseidonia.

=== Greek period ===
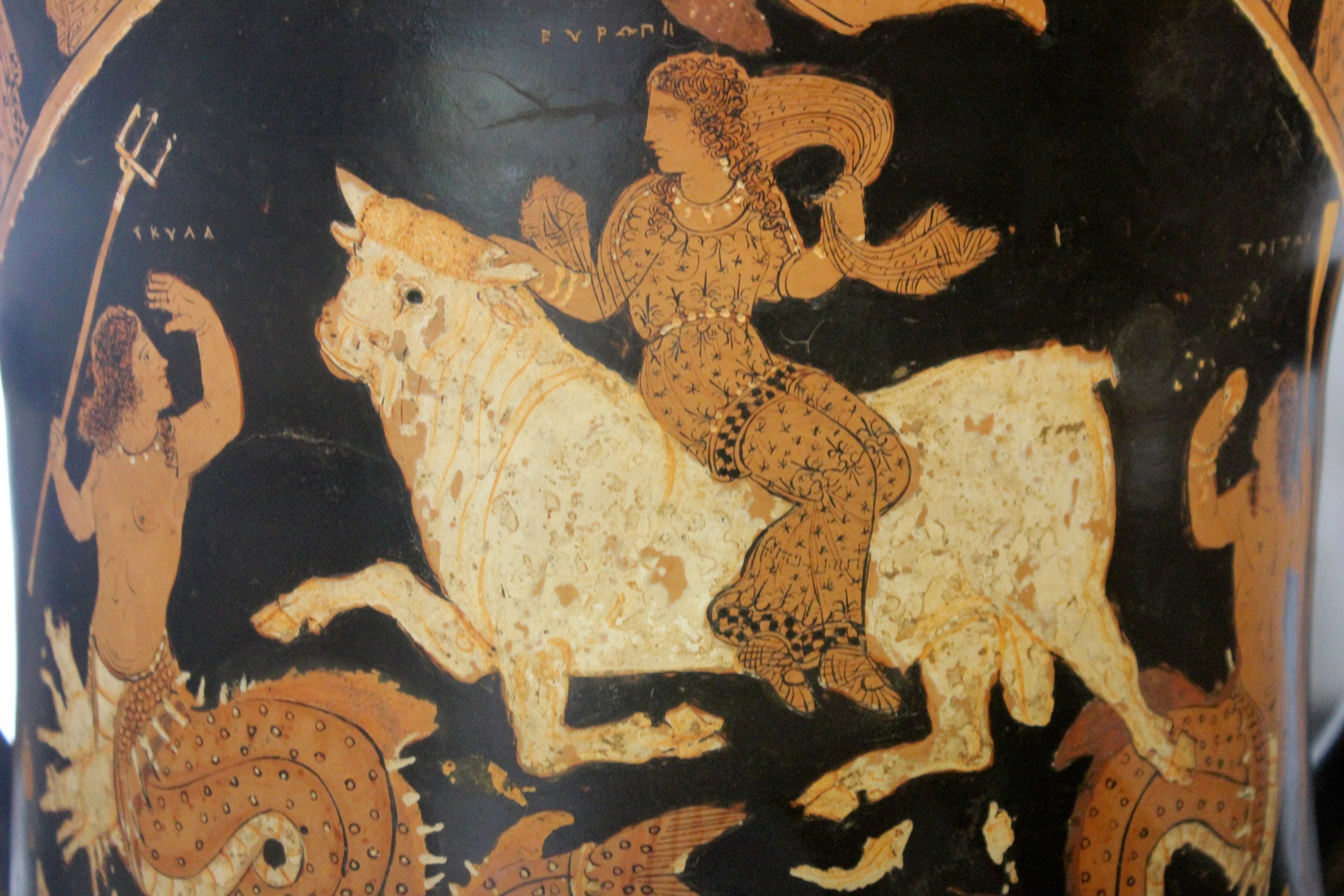
Rape of Europa from a krater, c. 350 BCE

Archaeological evidence from Paestum's first centuries indicates the building of roads, temples, and other features of a growing city. Coinage, architecture, and molded votive figurines all attest to close relations maintained with Metaponto in the sixth and fifth centuries.

It is presumed that Poseidonia harbored refugees from its mother city, Sybaris, when that city was conquered by Croton in 510 BCE. In the early fifth century, Poseidonia's coins adopted the Achaean weight standard and the bull seen on Sybarite coins. A. J. Graham thinks it was plausible that the number of refugees was large enough for some kind of synoecism to have occurred between the Poseidonians and the Sybarites, possibly in the form of a sympolity.

Poseidonia might have had a major share in a new foundation of Sybaris, which lasted from 452/1 BCE until 446/5 BCE. This is suggested by the great resemblance of the coins of Sybaris to those of Poseidonia during this period. Possibly a treaty of friendship between Sybaris, its allies, and the Serdaioi (an unknown people) dates to this new foundation, because Poseidonia was the guarantor of this treaty.

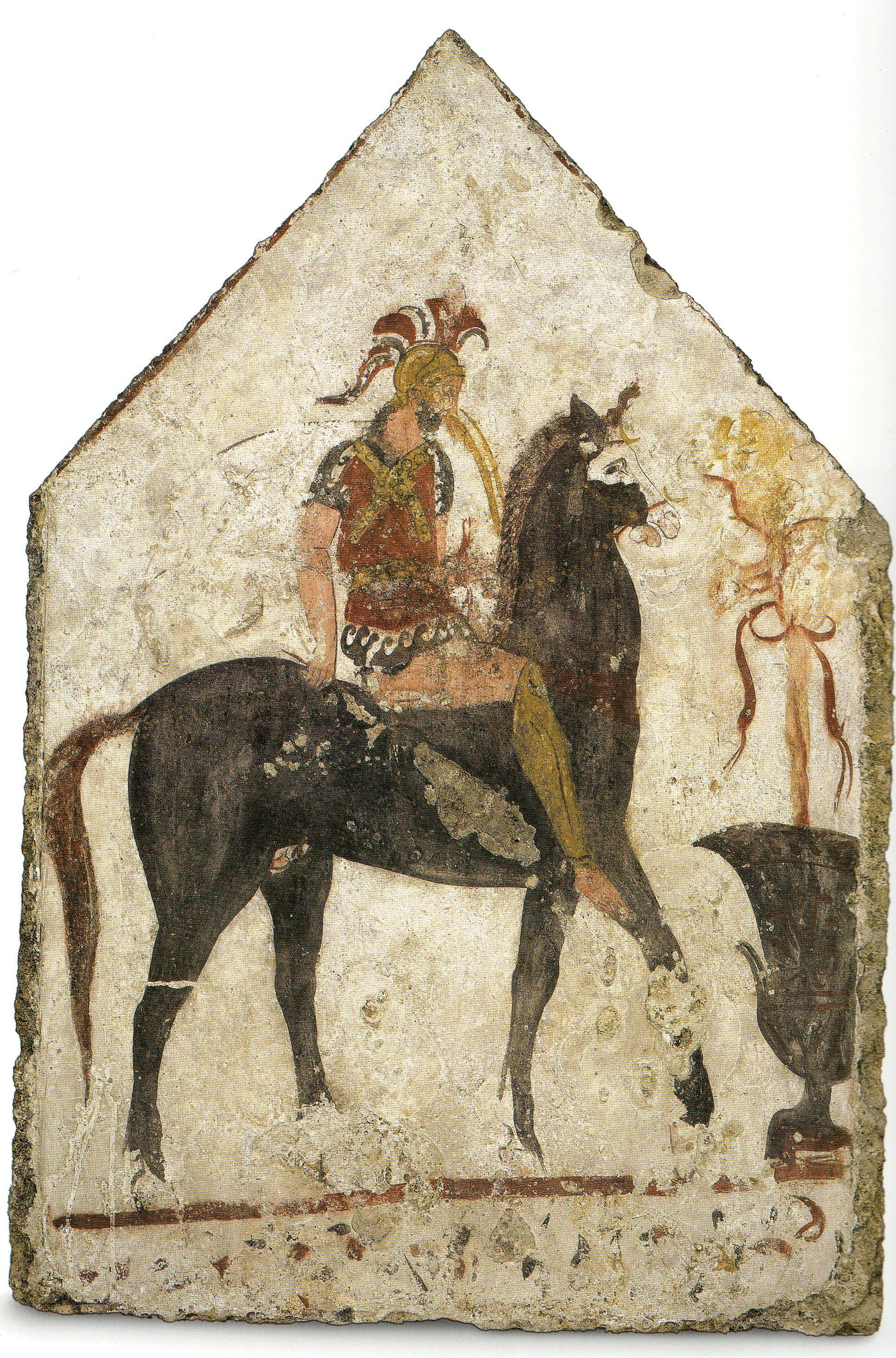
Fresco from the "Tomb of the Black Rider", c. 340 BCE

=== Lucanian period ===
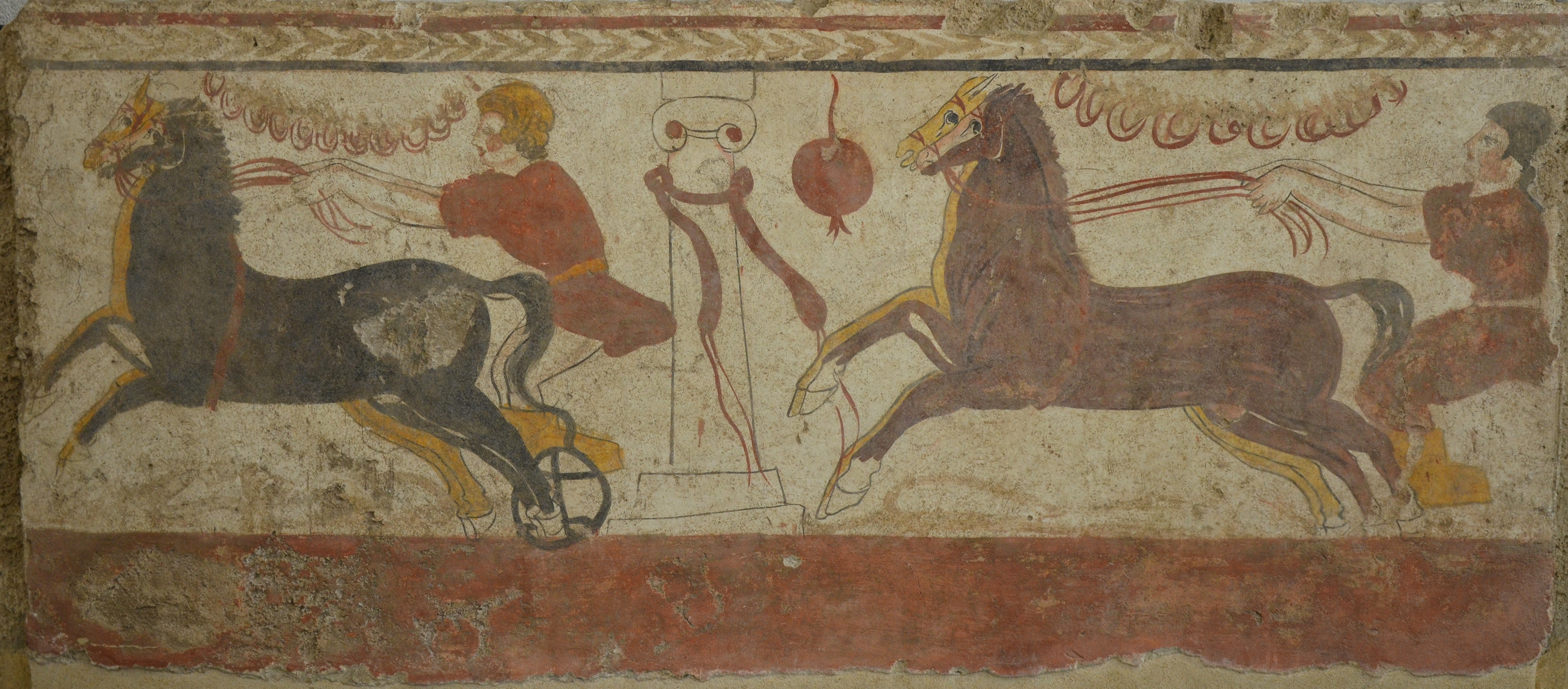
Fresco of chariot race and the winning post, third century BCE, in the museum

It is not until the end of the fifth century BCE that the city is mentioned, when according to Strabo, the city was conquered by the Lucanians. From the archaeological evidence it appears that the two cultures, Greek and Oscan, were able to thrive alongside one another.

Many tomb paintings show horses and horse-racing, a passion of the Lucanian elites.

=== Roman period and abandonment ===
It became the Roman city of Paestum in 273 BCE in the aftermath of the Pyrrhic War, in which the Graeco-Italian Poseidonians sided with king Pyrrhus of Epirus against the Roman Republic.

During the Carthaginian invasion of Italy by Hannibal, the city remained faithful to Rome and afterward, was granted special favours such as the minting of its own coinage. The city continued to prosper during the Roman imperial period and became a bishopric as the Roman Catholic Diocese of Pesto around 400 CE.

By the time of Virgil the city was "known for roses that bloomed twice a year", as he mentions in Book IV of his Georgics (c. 29 BCE). Then highly unusual, this is now a common feature of modern cultivars of garden roses.

It started to go into decline between the fourth and seventh centuries CE, and was abandoned during the Middle Ages. The bishopric was suppressed in 1100. Like Naples and most of the surrounding region, the inhabitants presumably spoke a Greek dialect throughout its history. The decline and desertion were probably due to changes in local land drainage patterns, leading to swampy malarial conditions. Raids by "Saracen" pirates and slavers also may have been a deciding factor. The remaining population seems to have moved to the more easily defended cliff-top settlement at Agropoli (i.e. "acropolis" or "citadel" in Greek), a few kilometres away, although this settlement became a base for Muslim raiders for a period. The Paestum site became overgrown and largely forgotten, although some stone spolia were collected and used in Salerno Cathedral by Robert Guiscard (d. 1085).

== Rediscovery ==
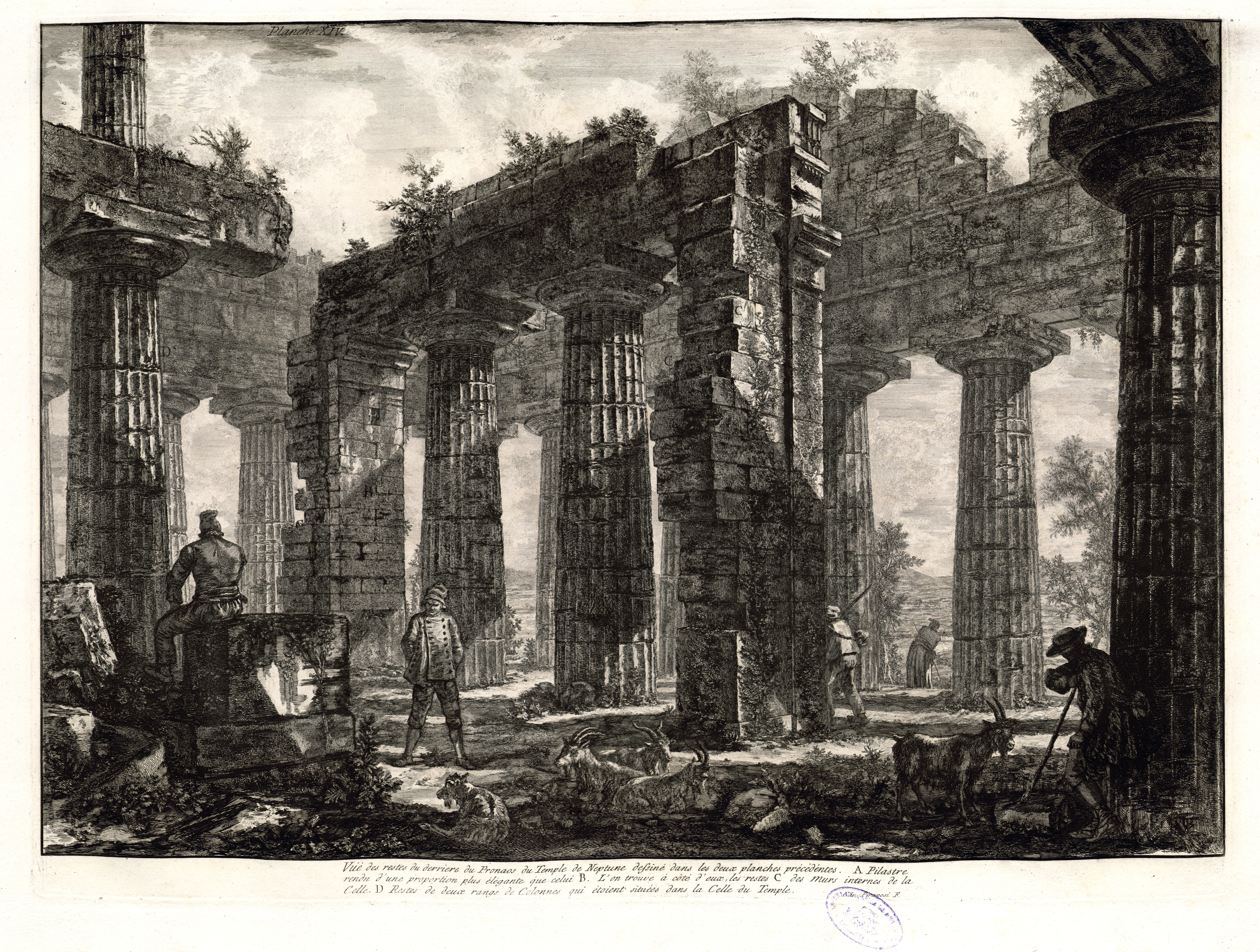
One of Giovanni Battista Piranesi's etchings, 1778

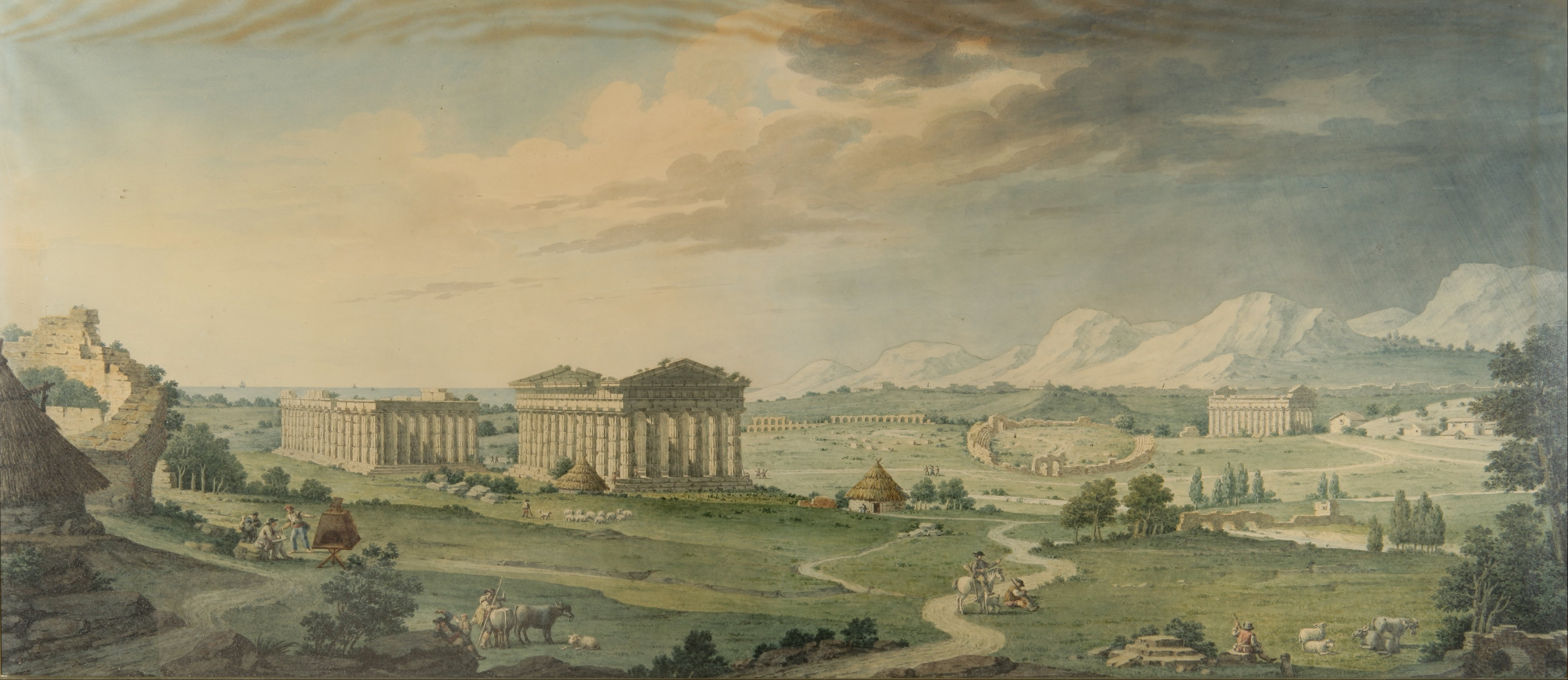
Isidro González Velázquez: View of the magnificent ruins of the ancient city of Paestum, 1837, showing part of the wall and the three temples

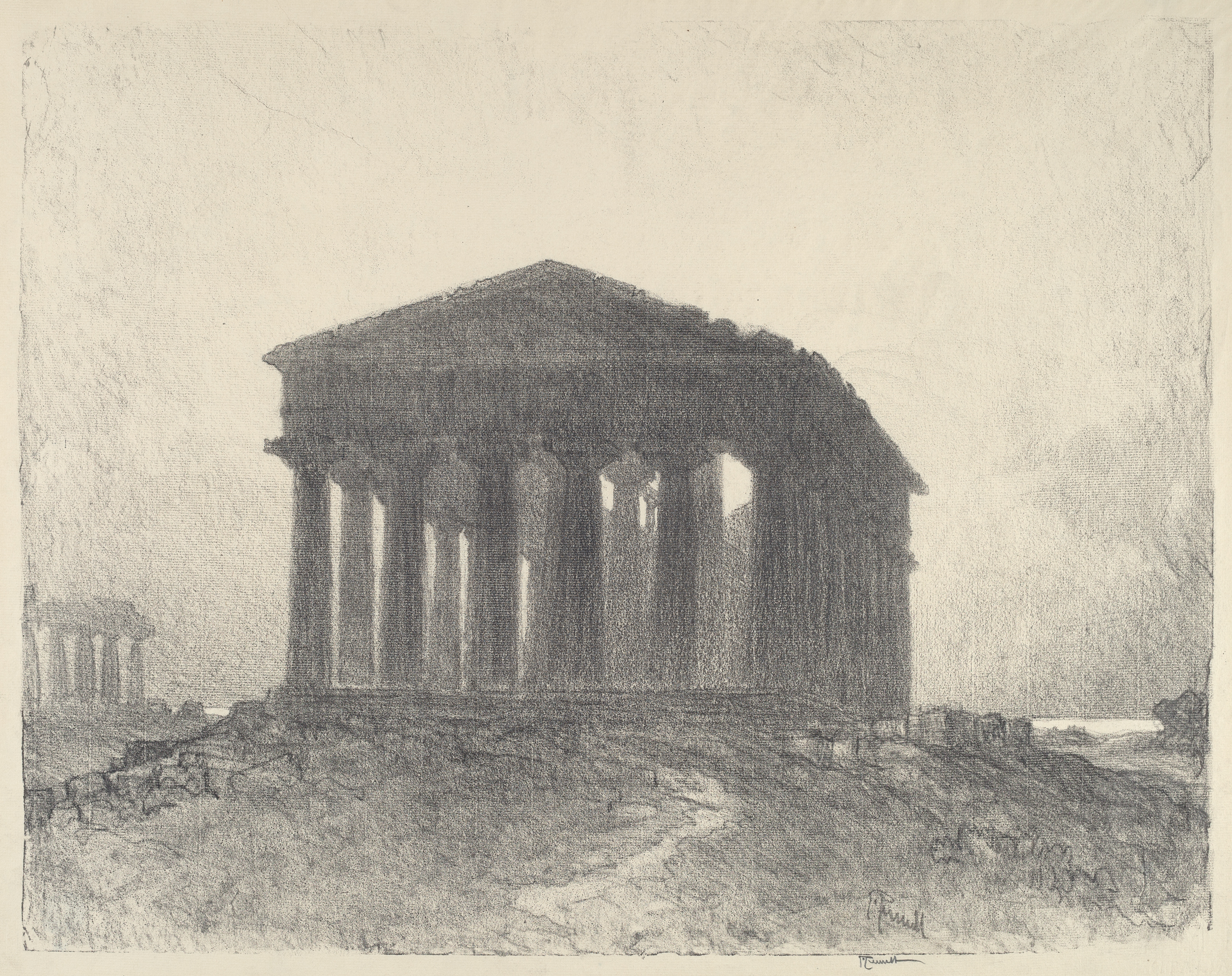
Joseph Pennell, Paestum, Evening, 1913

Despite stray mentions such as that in the history of Pietro Summonte in 1524, who correctly identified the three Doric temples as such, its ruins only came to wide notice again in the eighteenth century, following the rediscovery of the Roman cities of Pompeii and Herculaneum, and during the construction of a new coastal road south from Naples. The modern settlement had begun to revive by at least the sixteenth century, to the side of the ancient ruins. After a complicated start, the rediscovery of the three relatively easily accessible, and early, Greek temples created huge interest throughout Europe.

Giovanni Battista Piranesi visited to make a book of highly atmospheric but also accurate etchings, published in 1778; these and other prints were widely circulated. The complete and relatively simple form of the temples became influential in early Greek Revival architecture.

In 1740 a proposal was made, but not executed, to remove columns for the new Palace of Capodimonte in Naples. Initially, eighteenth-century savants doubted that the structures had been temples, and it was suggested variously, that they included a gymnasium, a public basilica or hall, or a "portico". There also was controversy and misunderstanding of their cultural background. Alessio Simmaco Mazzocchi, a clergyman and antiquarian, "the founder of the modern study of Magna Graecia" (the ancient Greeks in Italy), thought they were Etruscan, in line with his theories that Greek colonists merely had joined existing cultures in Italy, founded by peoples from farther east. He derived the etymology of "Poseidonia" from an invented Phoenician sea deity.

The first modern published account of the ruins was Les Ruines de Paestum in 1764, by G. P. M. Dumont, who had been taken to the site in 1750, along with the architect Jacques-Germain Soufflot, by Count Gazzola, an engineer for the government in Naples. Gazzola had drawn or commissioned measured drawings, to which Dumont added his own, as well as, more artistic plates. There was an expanded edition in 1769, the same year when a still more extensive account was published by the Englishman Thomas Major. By 1774 there were nine different illustrated publications on the site.

=== Second World War ===
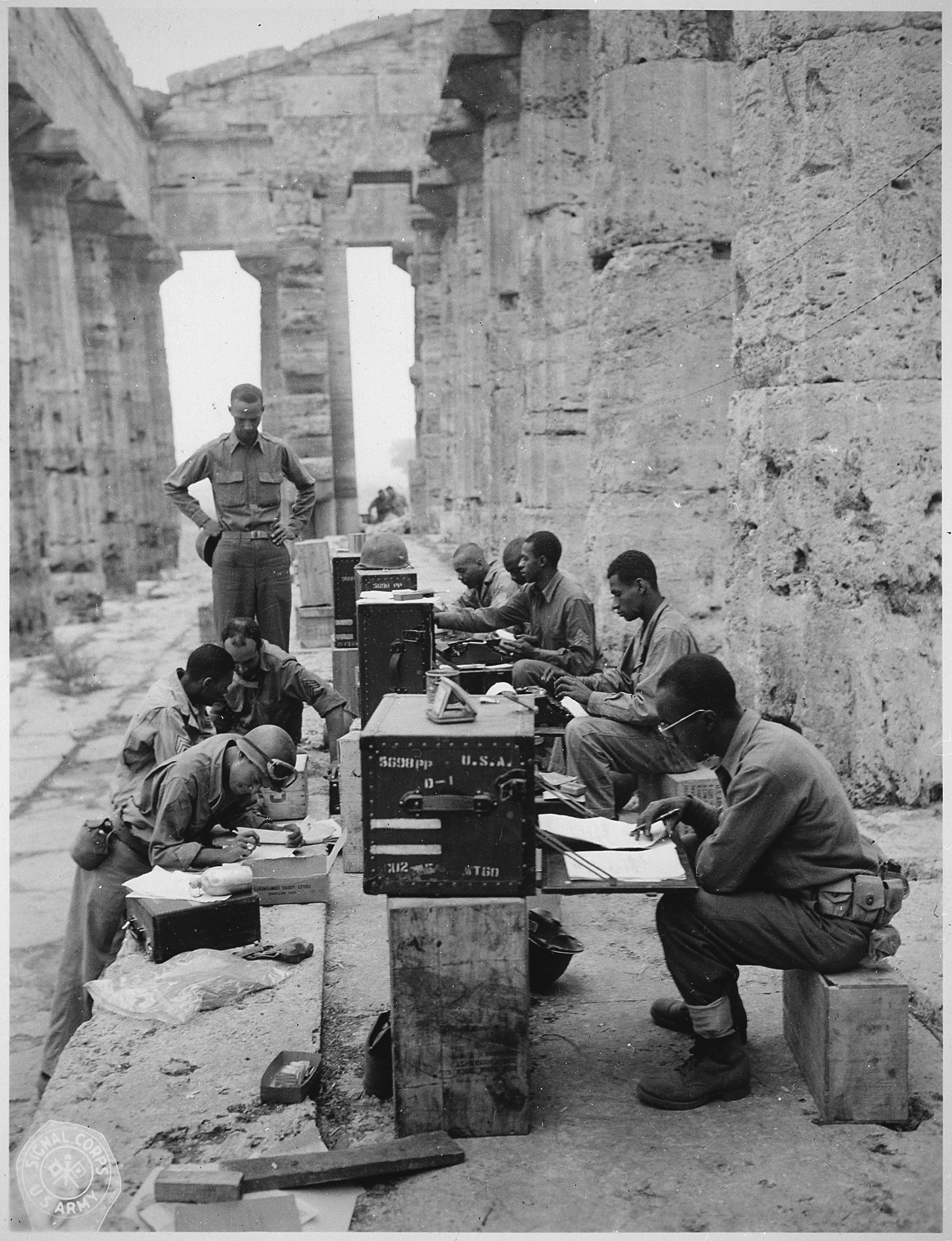
A US Army company with its transceiver office between the Doric columns of the Temple of Neptune, 22 Sept 1943

On September 9, 1943, Paestum was the location of the landing beaches of the U.S. 36th Infantry Division during the Allied invasion of Italy. German forces resisted the landings from the outset, causing heavy fighting within and around the town. Combat persisted around the town for nine days before the Germans withdrew to the north. The Allied forces set up their Red Cross first aid tents in and around the temples, as they were regarded as "off limits" to bombing by both sides.

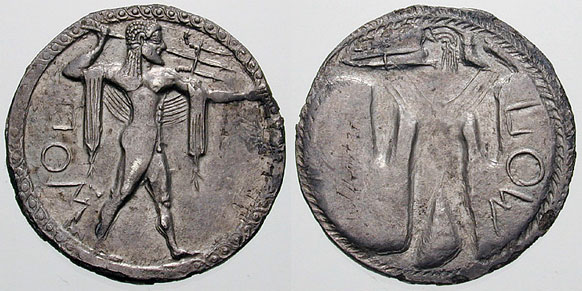
Nomos of Poseidonia, c. 530–500 BCE. Poseidon is seen wielding a trident with a chlamys draped over his arms.

=== Recent developments ===
In 2024, the Italian Ministry of Culture announced that two Doric style temples were uncovered at Paestum.

== Coins ==
The coins of Paestum date from about 550 BCE. These early issues may all be festival coins; they usually depict Poseidon with an upraised trident. Issues continue until the reign of Tiberius. For unknown reasons Paestum alone—of all the smaller Italian mints—was allowed to continue minting bronze coins by a Senatorial decree of about 89 BCE, after minting had been centralized. Later coins carry "P. S. S. C.", standing for "Paesti Signatum Senatus Consulto" to reflect this.

== In fiction ==
- In his partially fictionalized travelogue, The Innocents Abroad (1869), Mark Twain includes Paestum in the itinerary in Chapter 1 of the "great pleasure excursion to Europe and the Holy Land." The itinerary includes: "Rome [by rail], Herculaneum, Pompeii, Vesuvius, Vergil’s tomb, and possibly the ruins of Paestum can be visited..."
- In the novel My Ántonia (1918) by Willa Cather, the professor Gaston Cleric contracts a fever after spending the night outdoors admiring "the sea temples at Paestum".
- In the film Mare Nostrum (1926) by Rex Ingram, they visit Paestum.
- Gate to the Sea, a historical novel by Bryher published in 1958, portrays the flight of Harmonia, a Greek high priestess, from Poseidonia (Paestum), where the Greek inhabitants have been enslaved and culturally dominated by the Lucani since the death of Alexander the Great in 323 BCE.
- Scenes in the 1963 film Jason and the Argonauts (1963) were filmed here – notably when the Argonauts assist King Phineus (Patrick Troughton), who has been blinded and is tormented by harpies for his transgressions against the gods. In return for his advice on how to reach Colchis, the Argonauts render the harpies harmless by caging them.
- Scenes in the 1969 film Goodbye Mr Chips with Peter O'Toole and Petula Clark. The musical song’s last line is accompanied by that soaring ‘copter shot of the Temple of Neptune.
- Scenes in the 1981 film Clash of the Titans (where Perseus fights and kills Medusa's guardian, a two-headed dog) take place in Paestum.
- In the 2007 video game Medal of Honor: Airborne, the second mission set during Operation Avalanche takes place in Paestum.

== See also ==
- Ancient Greek architecture
- Roman Catholic Diocese of Pesto
- List of ancient Greek temples
- List of Greco-Roman roofs
- List of archaeological sites sorted by country

== Sources ==
- Cerchiai, Luca; Jannelli, Lorena; Longo, Fausto, eds. (2004). The Greek Cities of Magna Graecia and Sicily. Translated from Italian by the J. Paul Getty Trust. Los Angeles, CA: Getty Publications. ISBN 978-0-89236-751-1.
- Ceserani, Giovanna, Italy's Lost Greece: Magna Graecia and the Making of Modern Archaeology, 2012, Oxford University Press, ISBN 978-0-19-987679-2, Google books
- Wilton-Ely, John, The Mind and Art of Giovanni Battista Piranesi, 1978, Thames & Hudson, London, ISBN 0-500-09122-6
