= Temple of Poseidon =

This is a list of temples of Poseidon.

== Greece ==
- Temple of Poseidon at Kalaureia
- Temple of Poseidon at Sounion
- Temple of Isthmia
- Temple of Poseidon (Tainaron)

== Italy ==
- Temple of Poseidon (Colonna Reggina)
- Temple of Poseidon (Taranto)
- Second Temple of Hera (Paestum)

== Turkey ==
- Panionium

== See also ==
- Temple of Neptune (disambiguation)
