= Trachelium =

Trachelium may refer to:

- Trachelium (architecture), a part of a Doric or Ionic column
- Trachelium (bug), a genus of insects in the broad-headed bug family, Alydidae
- Trachelium (plant), a genus of plants in the bellflower family, Campanulaceae
