= Phiale (building) =

Enclosed or arcaded fountain

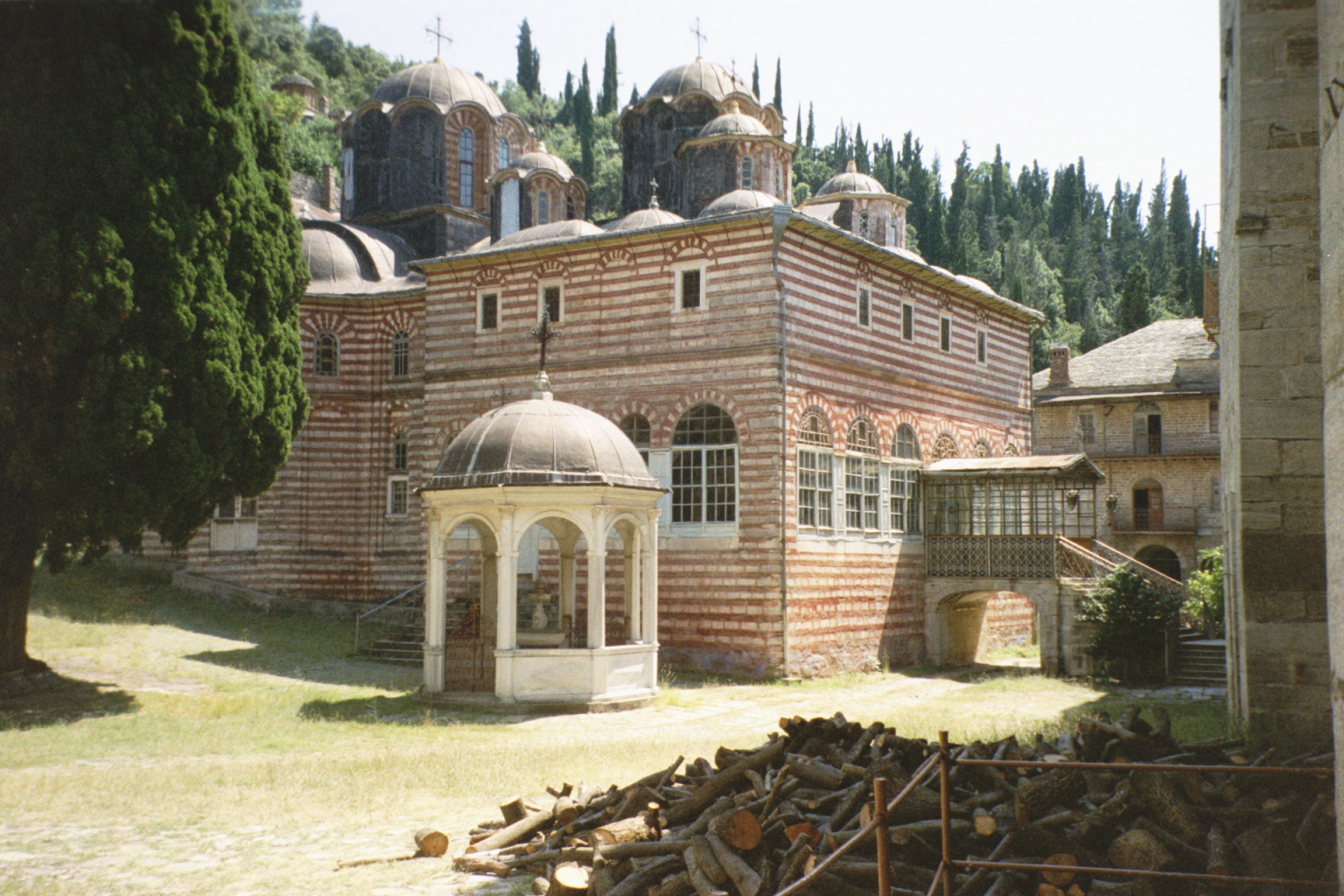
The katholikon at Zographou monastery on Mount Athos, with the phiale outside.

Phiale is a term in ancient Greek architecture for a building or columned arcade around a fountain, the equivalent of the Roman nymphaeum. The falling water from the fountain was and usually still is collected in a flattish bowl-shaped bowl, the usual meaning of phiale, as a shape for a vessel in Ancient Greek pottery or silverware.

In Byzantine architecture the phiale was also built in the atrium of, or just outside, a church or the katholikon (main church) of a monastery. Typically, there is an open arcade of columns supporting a small dome, often octagonal, as a symbol of the mystery (sacrament) of baptism or new life. In addition to allowing visitors to wash and refresh themselves before entering the church, the phiale is used for taking water for benedictions and in the ceremony of the Great Blessing of Waters at Epiphany.

== See also ==
- Glossary of architecture
- Baptistery

== Bibliography ==
- Emil Ivanov: Das Bildprogramm des Narthex im Rila-Kloster in Bulgarien unter besonderer Berücksichtigung der Wasserweihezyklen, Diss., Erlangen, 2002.
