= Hypotrachelium =

Groove in shaft of a Doric column

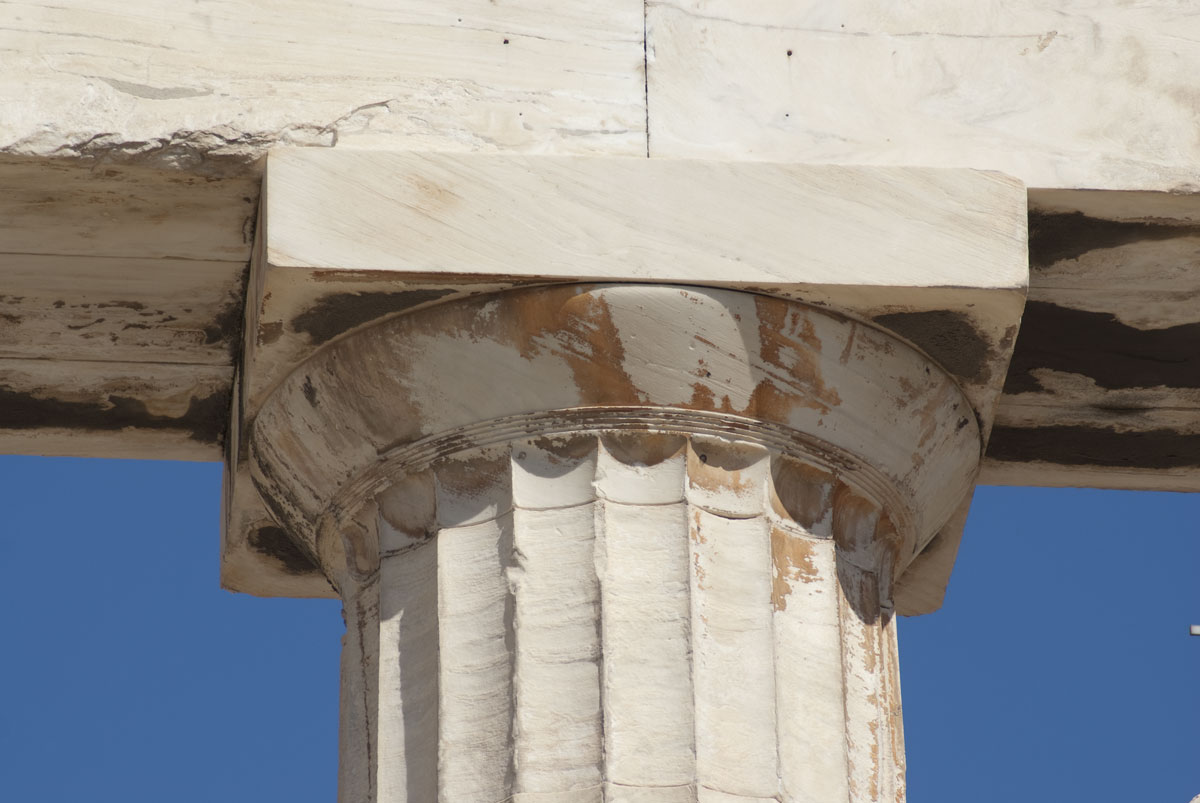
Hypotrachelium on a Doric column in the Parthenon, Athens

The hypotrachelium is the upper part or groove in the shaft of a Doric column, beneath the trachelium. The Greek form is hypotrakhelion.

In classical architecture, it is the space between the annulet of the echinus and the upper bed of the shafts, including, according to C. R. Cockerell, the three grooves or sinkings found in some of the older examples, as in the temple of Neptune at Paestum and the temple of Aphaea at Aegina; there being only one groove in the Parthenon, the Theseum and later examples. In the temple of Ceres and the so-called Basilica at Paestum the hypotrachelium consists of a concave sinking carved with vertical lines suggestive of leaves, the tops of which project forward. A similar decoration is found in the capital of the columns flanking the tomb of Agamemnon at Mycenae, but here the hypotrachelium projects forward with a cavetto moulding, and is carved with triple leaves like the buds of a rose.

In the Doric order the term was sometimes applied to that which is generally known as the "necking," the space between the fillet and the annulet.

The hypotrachelium was also called a collarino, or colarino, or colarin.
