= Temple of Neptune =

Temple of Neptune may refer to:

- An 18th century misnomer for the Second Temple of Hera (Paestum)
- The Temple of Neptune (Rome)
