= Retroquire =

Space behind the high altar in a church or cathedral

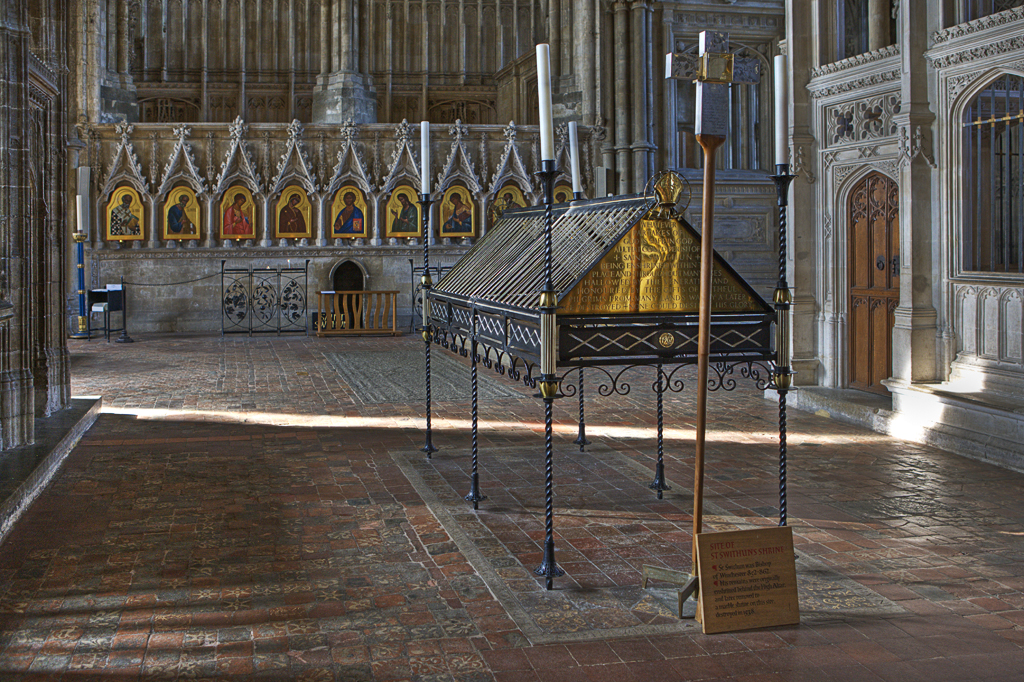
The retroquire in Winchester Cathedral

In church architecture, a retroquire (also spelled retrochoir), or back-choir, is the space behind the high altar in a church or cathedral, which sometimes separates it from the end chapel. It may contain seats for the church choir.

An example of a retroquire is within Winchester Cathedral, which was built between 1200 and 1230 to house a shrine for Saint Swithun.

They are usually heavily decorated, as in the case of the cathedral of Burgos, from 1498, or in the cathedral of Avila, with the tomb of El Tostado, from around 1511, but there are also simple ones, as in the New Cathedral of Salamanca, all of them found in Castilla y León, Spain.

== See also ==
- Cathedral diagram
- Choir (architecture)
- Ante-choir
- Church
