= Temple of Athena (Paestum) =

Building in Paestum, Italy

Coordinates: 40.4245°N 15.0054°E

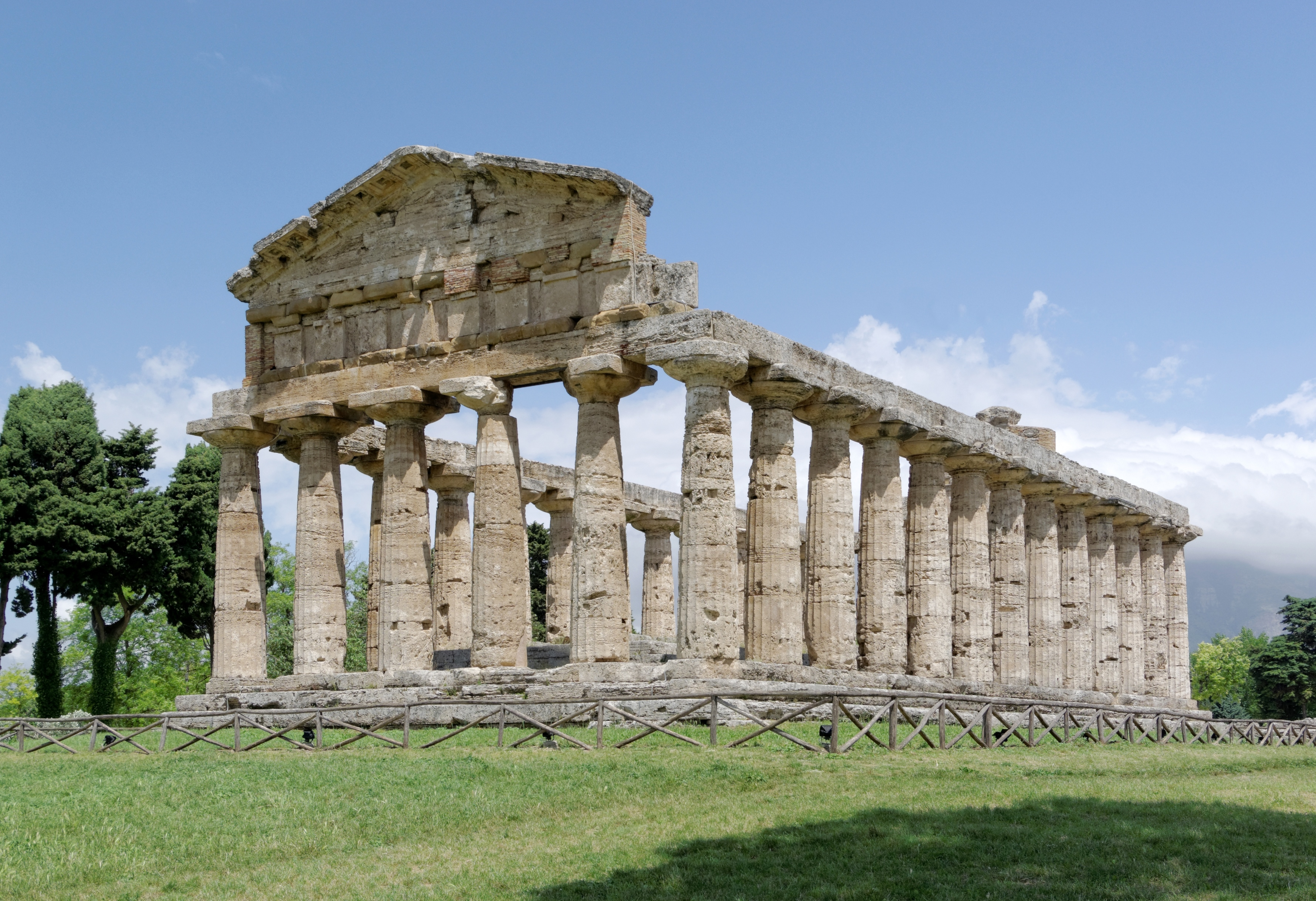
- Temple of Athena at Paestum (so-called "Temple of Ceres")

- Location within Italy

General information
- Architectural style: Doric and Ionic Columns; From Late Archaic Period
- Location: Paestum, Campania
- Construction started: ca. 510 B.C.
- Completed: ca. 500 B.C.

Technical details
- Size: 15m Wide by 33m Long

The Temple of Athena is a Greek temple of Magna Graecia found at Paestum, in Capaccio Paestum, a comune in the province of Salerno in the Campania region of south-western Italy. It was built around 500 BC and was for some time incorrectly thought to have been dedicated to Ceres, but as a result of the recovery of numerous statuettes in terracotta depicting Athena, it is now thought to have been dedicated to her.

Built on an artificial relief of the ground, it has a high pediment on the façade and a Doric frieze, adorned with metopes encased in sandstone, on slightly slender Doric columns. The structure is simpler than the two temples of Hera nearby, the first Temple of Hera, which is much larger than it, and the Second Temple of Hera.

The interior of the wide pronaos contained six columns in the Ionic style (four frontal and two on each side), of which the bases and two capitals remain. These capitals burst from an ornate collar. This seems to be the first example of two architectural orders, Doric and Ionic, co-existing in a single building. Almost nothing remains of the deep cella destined to house the statue of the goddess.

In late antiquity, around the eighth century, the structure was used as a church: the sanctuary was closed with walls between the columns, the walls of the cella were torn down, and the ambulatory in the south was used for burials. These structures were eliminated during the excavation campaigns of the 1940s.

== See also ==
- List of Ancient Greek temples

== Bibliography ==
- Bianchi Bandinelli, Ranuccio; Paribeni, Enrico (1986). L'Arte dell'antichità classica. Grecia. Torino: UTET. p. 55.
- Richter, Gisela Marie Augusta (1969). L'arte greca. Torino: Einaudi. p. 23.
