= Trachelium (architecture) =

Architectural term

Trachelium (from the Ancient Greek: τράχηλος for "neck") is the term in architecture given to the neck of the capital of the Doric and Ionic orders. In the Greek Doric capital it is the space between the annulets of the echinus and the grooves, which marked the junction of the shaft and capital.

In some early examples, as in the basilica and temple of Ceres at Paestum and the temple at Metapontum, it forms a sunk concave moulding, which by the French is called the gorge. In the Roman Doric and the Ionic orders the term is given by modern writers to the interval between the lowest moulding of the capital and the top of the astragal and annulet, which were termed the hypotrachelium.
