= Bench table =

A bench table (French: banc; Italian: sedile; German: Bank) is a low stone seat which runs round the interior of the walls of many large churches. Bench tables are also found around the bases of pillars, and in porches and cloisters.

A bench table is also known as a table with a bench seat, which is a type of long seat that has the purpose of holding more than 1 person at one time. Commonly, a bench table is placed in outdoor locations such as the garden, park, and side of the pedestrian passage. But also indoor spaces, especially public venues like airports, government offices and churches, often place bench tables.

Bench table has various types of geometric forms. The most familiar one is the rectangular-shaped bench table and the circular-shaped bench table. Moreover, it has discrete size of widths and lengths depending on the location. Generally, churches have bench tables with narrow width and long length in terms of accepting many people in the limited size of the place. On the other hand, bench tables which are located at outdoor locations such as parks have a large surface so that people can put things for dining, studying and working on the table.

Also, bench tables are manufactured in diverse types of materials. The most original material of the bench table is wooden board. In the middle age of Europe, English oak was the leading material of medieval times, but also softened woods are used in manufacturing bench tables.

== History ==
=== Ancient ===
Table is known as used since the ancient period with various materials of wood, metal, and stone. In Egypt, a number of pieces of furniture were found in tombs dating back to the ancient kingdom. Thrones, chairs, stools, and desks were all found in luxurious decorations that represent the status and formality of the ruling class. It is not clear that the table appears that era is exactly a bench table but the bench table has various formations and types therefore possibly a bench table had been used since that era. From the tomb of architect Kha at B.C 1375, a table has been found which has a rectangular wood board on top and which has been tanned and painted that hold up by four legs. From the tomb, food was placed on the table which was possibly offered to a god. Thus, in the ancient Egyptian period, table was commonly used for religious purposes to offer to an ancient Egyptian god.

=== Medieval ===
The Middle Ages, which developed after the fall of the Roman Empire, were a period of a thousand years from the 4th to the 15th century, when religion and politics were mixed, starting with the Eastern Roman Empire. At that time furniture and art were created under religious and political norms. Mediaeval furniture mainly went through four stages: early Christianity, Romanesque, Gothic, and Byzantine. After that, from the Renaissance period, furniture became a necessity and began to develop. During this period, aristocrats began to build many palaces and villas in the 15th century with the aim of showing off huge structures and luxurious interior decorations based on the vast wealth accumulated in banking and various trades. Wealth, power, and yearning are projected by the inclusion of plants, animals, geometrical, religious, and classical patterns in the bench table. The Acanthus pattern is one of the most common patterns, and it can be found in a table of this period. Moreover, emergence of animal patterns not only embodies the ruler's will to power, but also reflects the influence of certain aspects of religious culture on art. Also, the furniture called “pew” appeared around this period which is a mixture of a bench table and a bench seat which are widely used in churches.

=== Modern ===
Bench tables are usually installed outdoors for outdoor activities such as picnic, outdoor dining, and recreational activity. From the 19th century, outdoor meals became popular, and bench tables and bench chairs began to grow in the park.

== Design ==
Types of Bench tables often depend on their uses and locations.

=== Design ===
The most common shape of a bench table is a rectangular shaped table, which is a long table with a bench chair. However, the bench table has various geometric forms, not only rectangular shapes but also circular shapes, hexagonal shapes and so on. It varies depending on where the tables are located and how tables are used. Moreover, there are experimental bench tables such as solar energy generating bench tables. It has a solar energy panel at the roof which also blocks the rain for people who are using a bench table and it has a battery at the bottom of the table which can be used.

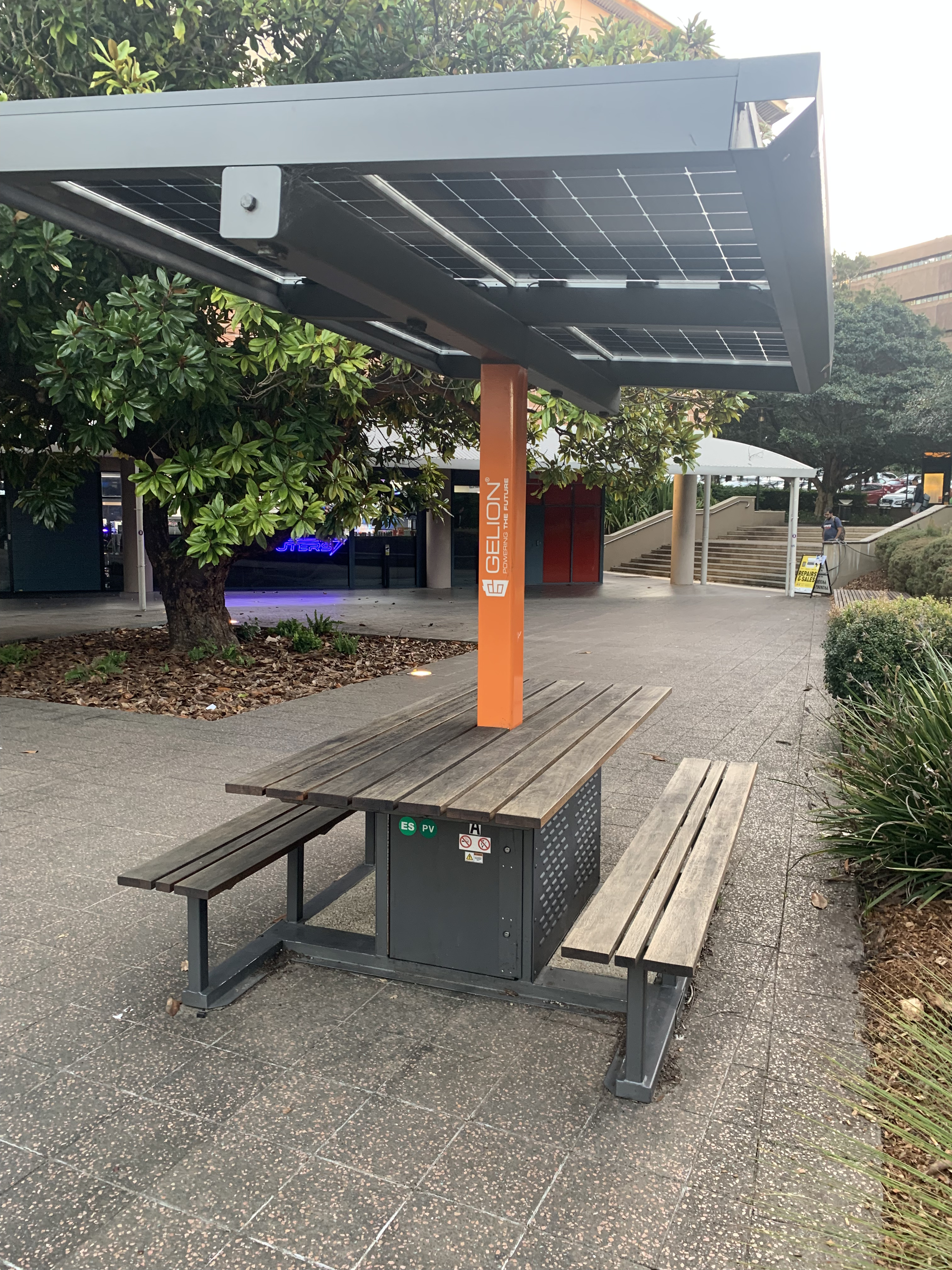
solar energy generation bench table at University of Sydney

=== Location ===
The most common location where a bench table is installed is outdoor public places such as a park. As a characteristic of outdoor public places, those locations have a large number of floating population that passes and stays. Therefore, bench tables that are located in public spaces often have a purpose of resting and having a picnic. Bench tables that are located in public places are mostly installed on the floor. However, bench tables are located in indoor locations. Typically, churches usually have a unique design of bench table which is called “Pew”. Pew is a type of furniture that combines a chair with a table. When there is service at the churches, churches take a large number of people, but they have a limited size of the space. Due to this issue, churches use “Pew” which have dual functional furniture that are also efficient on the space application side.

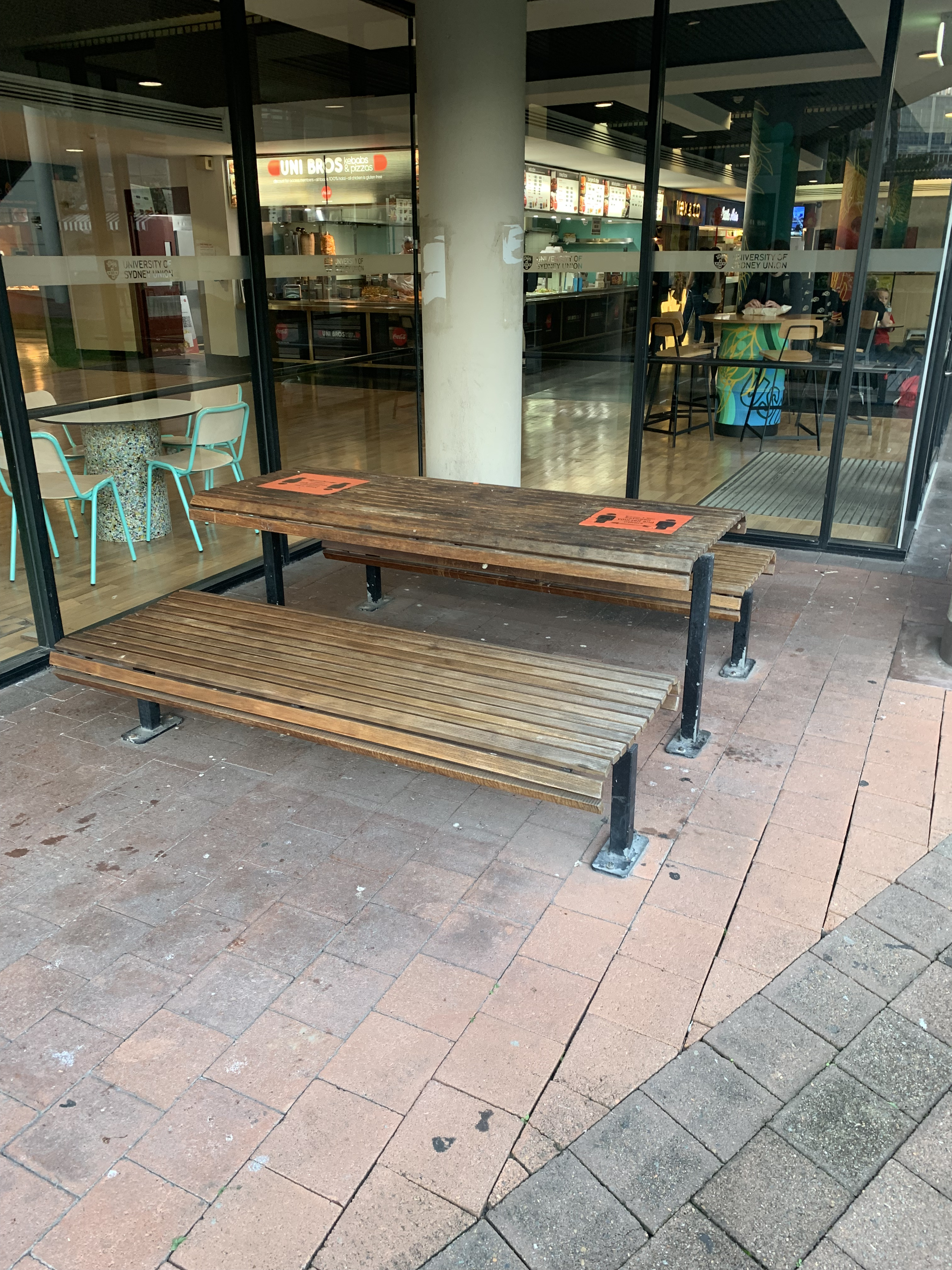
Bench table at cafeteria at University of Sydney

== Materials ==
=== Wood ===
Wood is a common type of material that crafts bench tables. Woods have served as furniture since prehistoric times by sitting on tree roots like a chair. From the past to the present, wood is the most commonly used material for furniture. The strength of wood is, most materials that are used in crafting such as steel, aluminium, and plastic have a hot-shortness nature which means they expand due to heat which causes reduction of intensity. The expansion can cause the shape of the furniture to deteriorate. But wood is not affected by thermal expansion. Scientifically, thermal expansion occurs when the humidity of wood is below zero percent, but even in the driest areas, the humidity of wood does not drop below five percent. Because of the high specific heat of the tree, it consumes more energy than other materials such as concrete to raise the temperature of the tree. Bench tables are usually located at outdoor locations such as parks, pedestrian roads and in front of the buildings. The characteristic of these outdoor places is that they get sunlight right away. Therefore, wood is preferred when crafting bench tables. Moreover, Wood oxidises, but wood doesn't rust like metal. On the other hand, wood also has a disadvantage. Outdoor locations have no roof, so the bench table gets wet when there is rain. This rain can cause fungi to grow and rot wood. To prevent this, apply wood preservative. By applying preservative it prevents germs from forming, and prevents dissolving in moisture.

=== Metal ===
Metal bench tables are preferred at public locations due to metal requiring less maintenance. One of the significant issues with bench tables that are located in outdoor locations is vandalism. Possible vandalism that can occur to public bench tables is graffiti, carving, and destroying bench tables. Metal is substantially better at preventing vandalism than other materials. In case of graffiti, wood is hygroscopic it absorbs the moisture in paint. Therefore, it is harder to erase it without any damage to the bench table. Moreover, wood is vulnerable to carving vandalism. On the other hand, metal is harder to leave a carving on compared to wood and easier to erase graffiti from it. The disadvantage of metal is oxidation. As public parks are considered as one of the landmarks of the city or town, oxidized bench tables could give a negative impression. It can be prevented by implementing protection on surfaces such as paint.

=== Plastic ===
Plastic bench tables are not only preferred in public venues such as offices, universities, shopping malls and restaurants, but also preferred in private locations such as houses. Because it is easy to maintain, lightweight and has a diverse colour choice and design. Among various types of plastic, (high density polyethylene) is the most commonly used in making furniture. Due to concern of the duration of plastic, it improves its strength by blending with wood flour (Gao, 2004).

=== Stone ===
Stone bench tables have a high duration but cost a lot. Because of the characteristics of stone which is very heavy, stone bench tables are located in place permanently and mostly located in outdoor venues.

== Problems ==
=== Vandalism ===
Due to the characteristic of bench tables, which are often located outdoors, vandalism occurs quite often. The type of vandalism is graffiti, carving, and destroying bench tables. According to Samdahl and Christensen (1985), these kinds of vandalism happen more frequently where bench tables are already vandalised. Under ecological psychology, vandalism which happened before and being neglected triggered further vandalism. This behaviour was also researched by Kelling and Wilson in 1982 by the name of “Broken Windows Theory”. According to “Broken Windows Theory”, In the 1980s, there were more than 600,000 felonies a year in New York, when travellers openly said never to take the New York subway, and in fact police patrol the subway every day, New York's security was literally a mess. In 1984, a staff member of the Transportation Bureau was deployed to the subway vehicle base to erase graffiti. As a result, the number of serious subway crimes in New York has decreased by 75 percent. Therefore, To prevent vandalism, the key part is to maintain a bench table neat all the time. Administrator of public space such as parks, buildings or public venues should be aware of erasing graffiti immediately before it causes further vandalism activity. Graffitis occurred in any material type of bench table, but carving usually occurred in wood type bench tables because wood is easy to get carved compared to other types of materials.

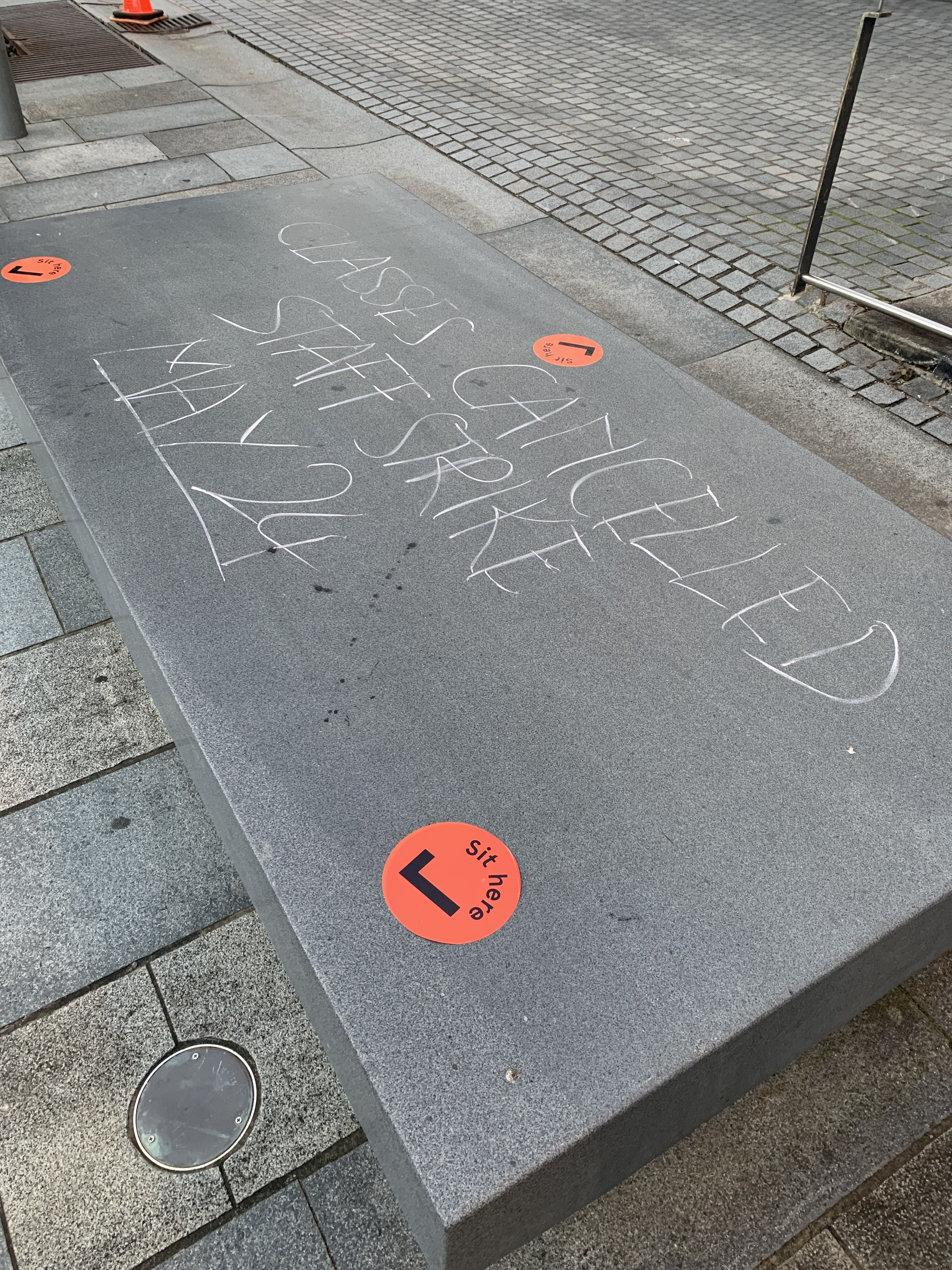
Message on Bench table at University of Sydney

=== Environmental impact ===
As wood is one of the most common materials that is used when producing bench tables, it has an influence in deforestation. In 2018, the World resource institute reported that Indonesia has one of the largest forest areas with Brazil. But from a scientist's perspective, Sumatra's rainforests are going to disappear in the near future, like in 20 years. Due to this deforestation, wildlife in Indonesian rainforest such as orangutans, tigers, and rhinos are going to lose their habitats and will go extinct. Moreover, carbon dioxide needs to be absorbed by forests but due to deforestation forests are less effectively absorbing it which leads to increased greenhouse gases in the atmosphere and which finally causes global warming. Bench tables are often located at recreational sites such as national parks, so they have a large population of people using them as tables for picnics and other recreational activities. However, people often left their garbage at recreational sites. Due to littering, animals are endangered . The most common trash that is left is cans, bottles, and disposable plastic products. Broken cans and bottles have sharp edges, which can cause serious damage to wild animals. Furthermore, animals can try to eat plastic products that can choke them and can cause serious damage to their digestive organs.
