= Ante-choir =

Church architectural term

In church architecture, the term ante-choir refers to the space enclosed in a church between the outer gate or railing of the rood screen and the door of the screen; sometimes there is only one rail, gate or door, but in Westminster Abbey it is equal in depth to one bay of the nave. The ante-choir is also called the "fore choir".

== See also ==
- Retroquire, the space behind the high altar.
