= First Temple of Hera (Paestum) =

Archaic Greek temple in Italy

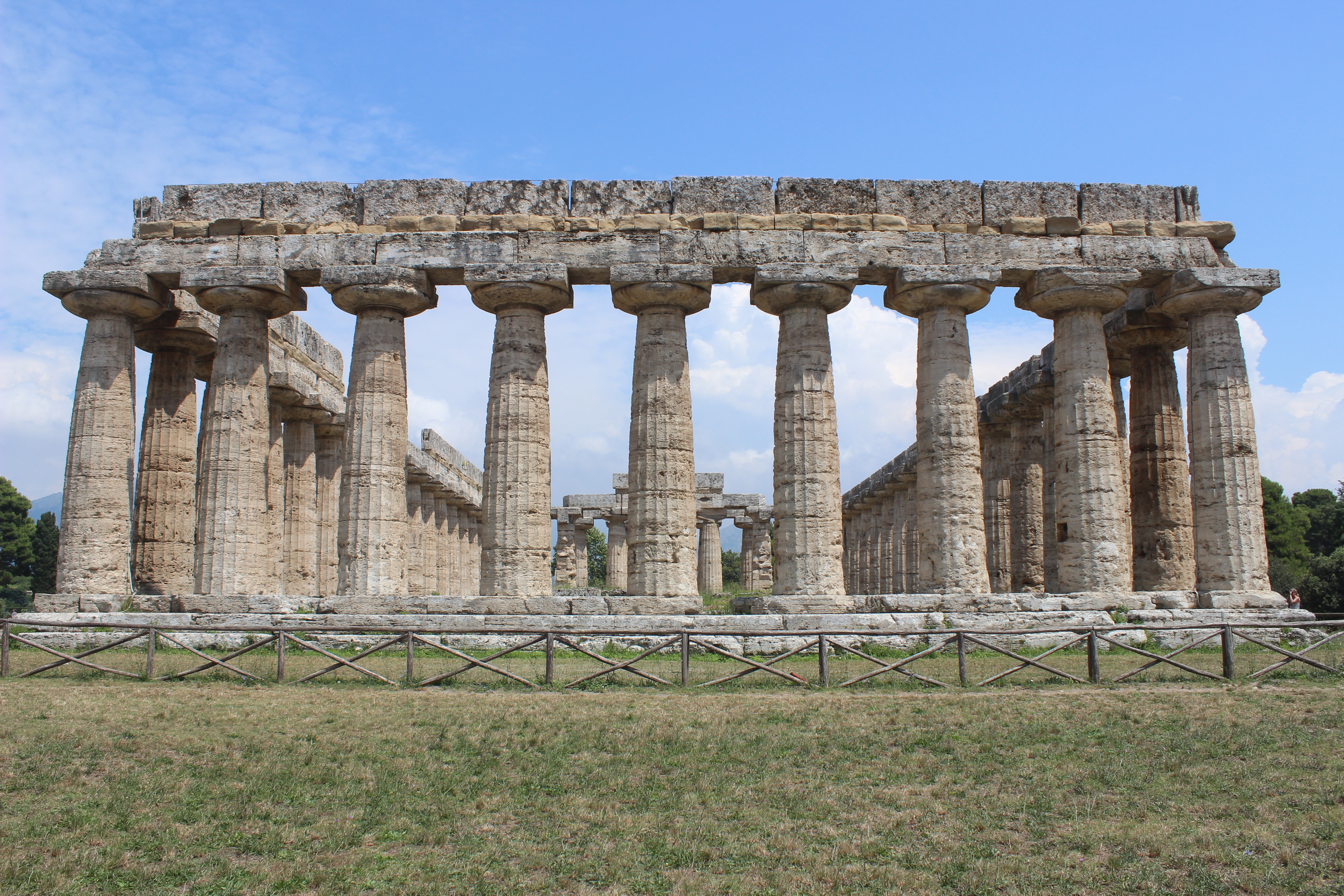
The Western end

The First Temple of Hera (Paestum)—also known as Temple of Hera I and the Basilica—is an archaic Doric order Greek temple in the ruins of the ancient city of Paestum, Italy. This Doric temple is considered one of the oldest Greek temples in Italy and is known for its distinctive architectural features. It was built around 550–525 BCE, within a century of the city's establishment by Greek colonists from Sybaris, who named the city Poseidonia.

== Architecture ==
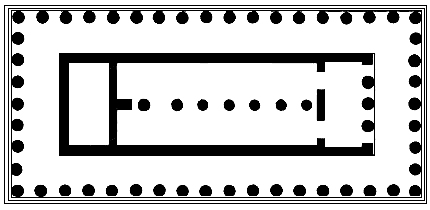
Plan of the temple

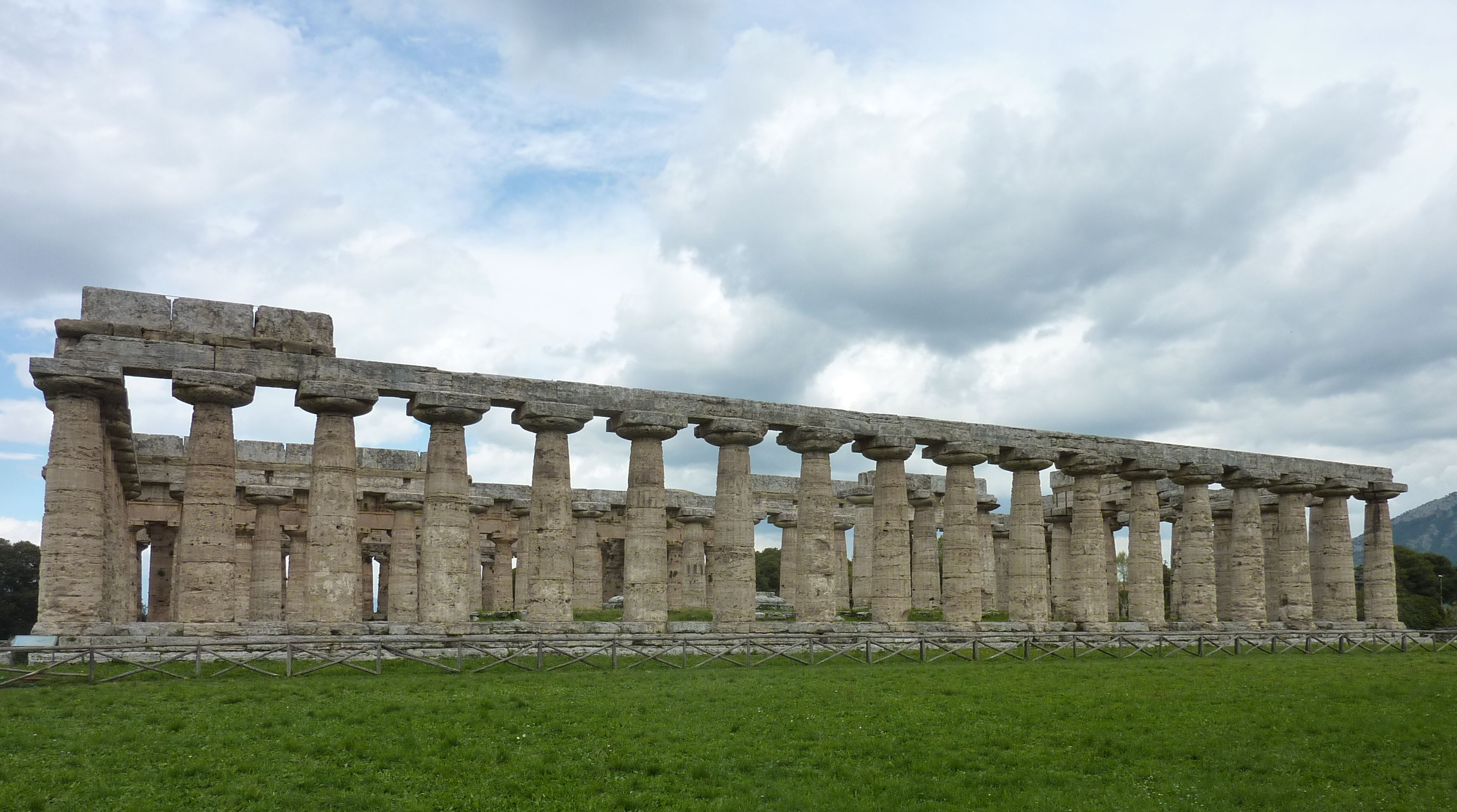
Side view

The temple is peripteral with 9×18 external columns on a three-step stylobate, a feature that contributes to its pseudodipteral layout.

The Basilica stands out for its unusual architecture. This is the only temple in Italy that features a naos (the central room of the temple) divided by columns, a characteristic typically observed in Greek temples located in Crete. This division has led to other unusual choices, such as the double entrance and three columns for the pronaos (front porch). The reason for this internal division, and the fact that all internal columns are the same size as those of the peristyle (outer colonnade), remains unknown.

Several features of the Temple of Hera I are preserved in remarkable condition. All the peristyle's 50 columns, including the architraves, have survived, some still boasting a floral decorative band beneath the echinus, the round part of a Doric column. The three columns in the pronaos are still in situ, along with the antae (pilasters). However, only the foundations of the external walls of the naos can be seen, as the walls have mostly disappeared, and the frieze has completely vanished.

== Cult of Hera ==
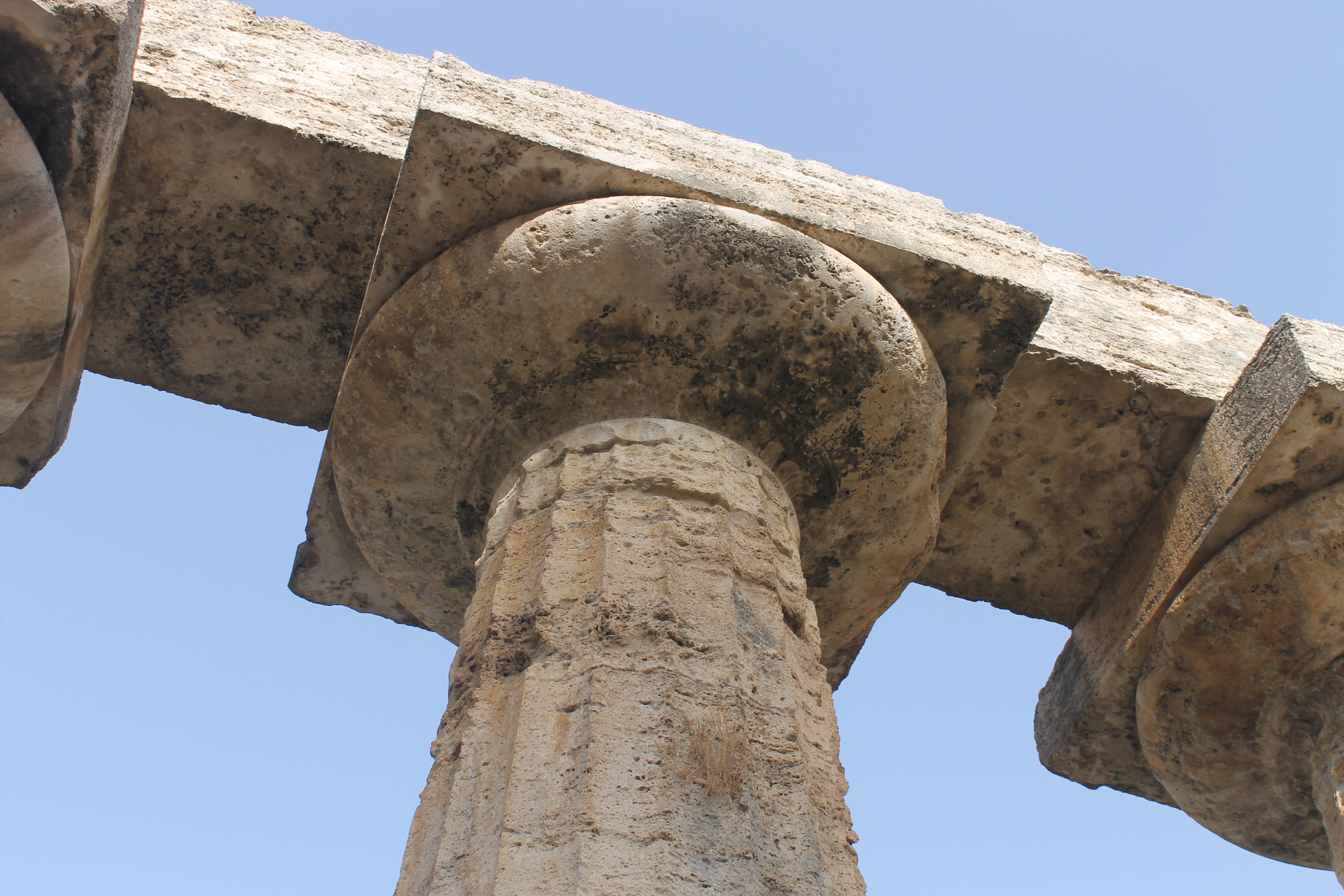
Column tops

The temple has a rich history tied to its patron goddess, Hera. The dedication to Hera is confirmed by votive gifts, most of which are small female terracotta statues bearing the Greek letters ΗΡ or ΗΡΑ. These gifts, along with other artifacts, were often buried in special consecrated pits close to the temple.

The cult of Hera was possibly aimed at ensuring fertility for local communities. Many worshippers were, or prayed on behalf of, young, betrothed women. Despite subsequent conquests by the Lucanians and Romans, the worship of Hera remained important and continued after the construction of a second temple dedicated to the same goddess.

== History ==
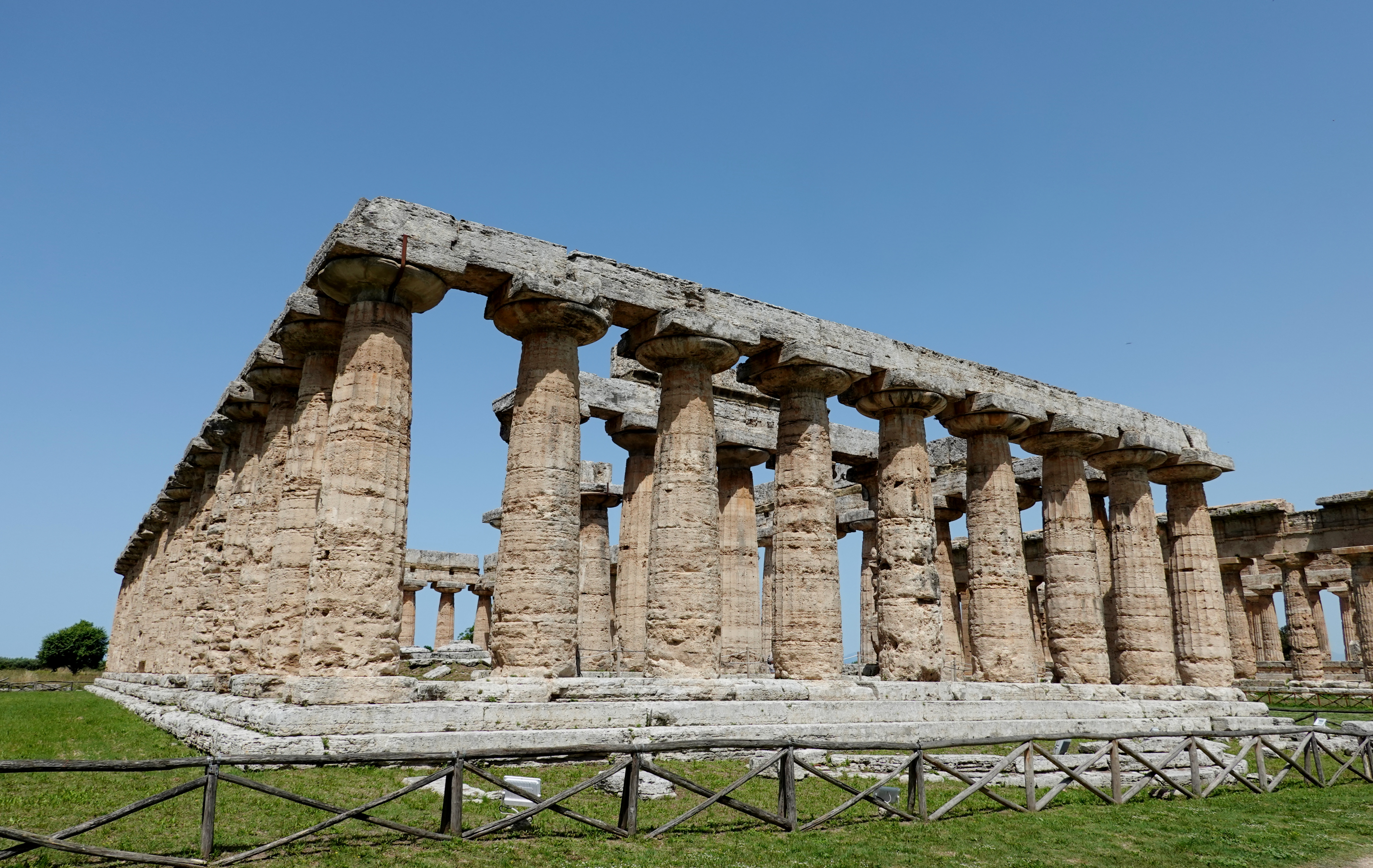
View, with the Second Hera temple behind

Over time, the Temple of Hera I has witnessed significant changes. In late antiquity, as Paestum declined and pagan cults came to an end, the temple was abandoned. Additionally, the city itself has undergone transformations, including being conquered by the Lucanians and then by the Romans. It was abandoned in Late Antiquity or the Early Middle Ages, probably for being too vulnerable to Saracen raids, the remaining population moving to the safer site of Agropoli nearby.

Today, the most significant remnants of Paestum's Greek past are its temples, including the Temple of Hera I.

== In film ==
The site was used as a filming location for the film Jason and the Argonauts (1963 film). The temple is inhabited by Phineus, where he is tormented by two harpies. Jason and his companions use the structure of the temple to lure and trap the creatures.

== Gallery ==
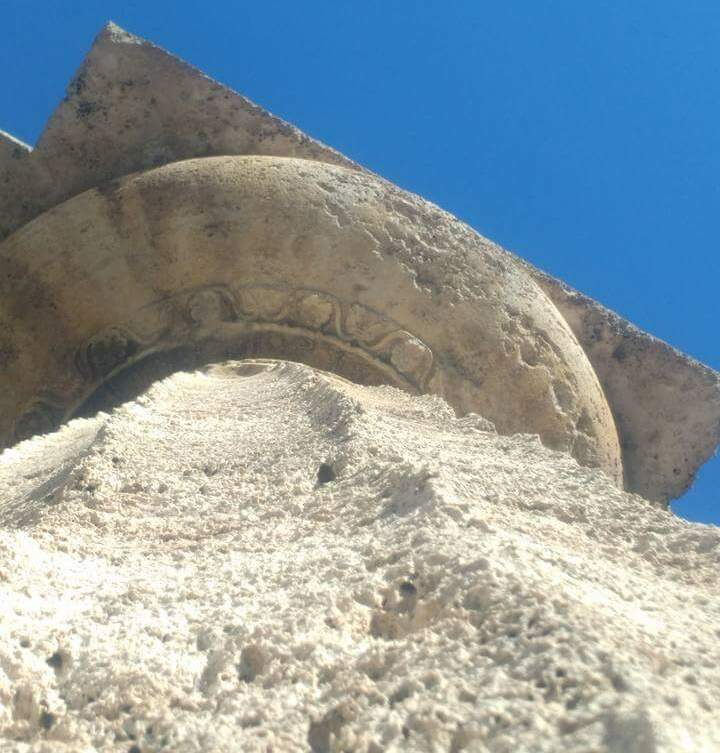
Foliage decoration on the capital

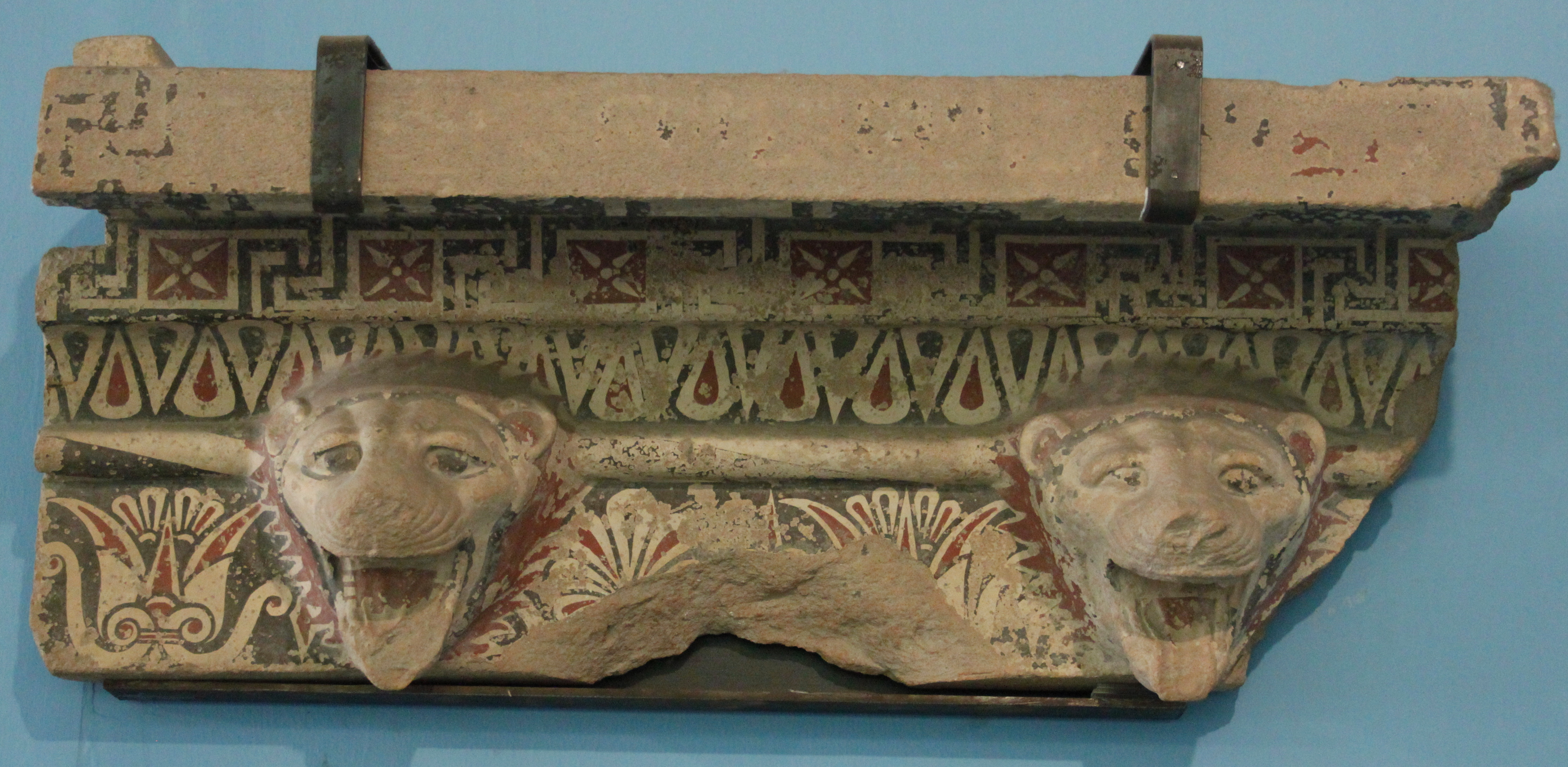
Section of terracotta sima frieze, Paestum Museum
