= Gorgerin =

Part of an architectural column

In architecture, a gorgerin (from the French: gorge meaning throat) is the neckline or portion of a capital of a column, or a feature forming the junction between a shaft and its capital.
