= Second Temple of Hera (Paestum) =

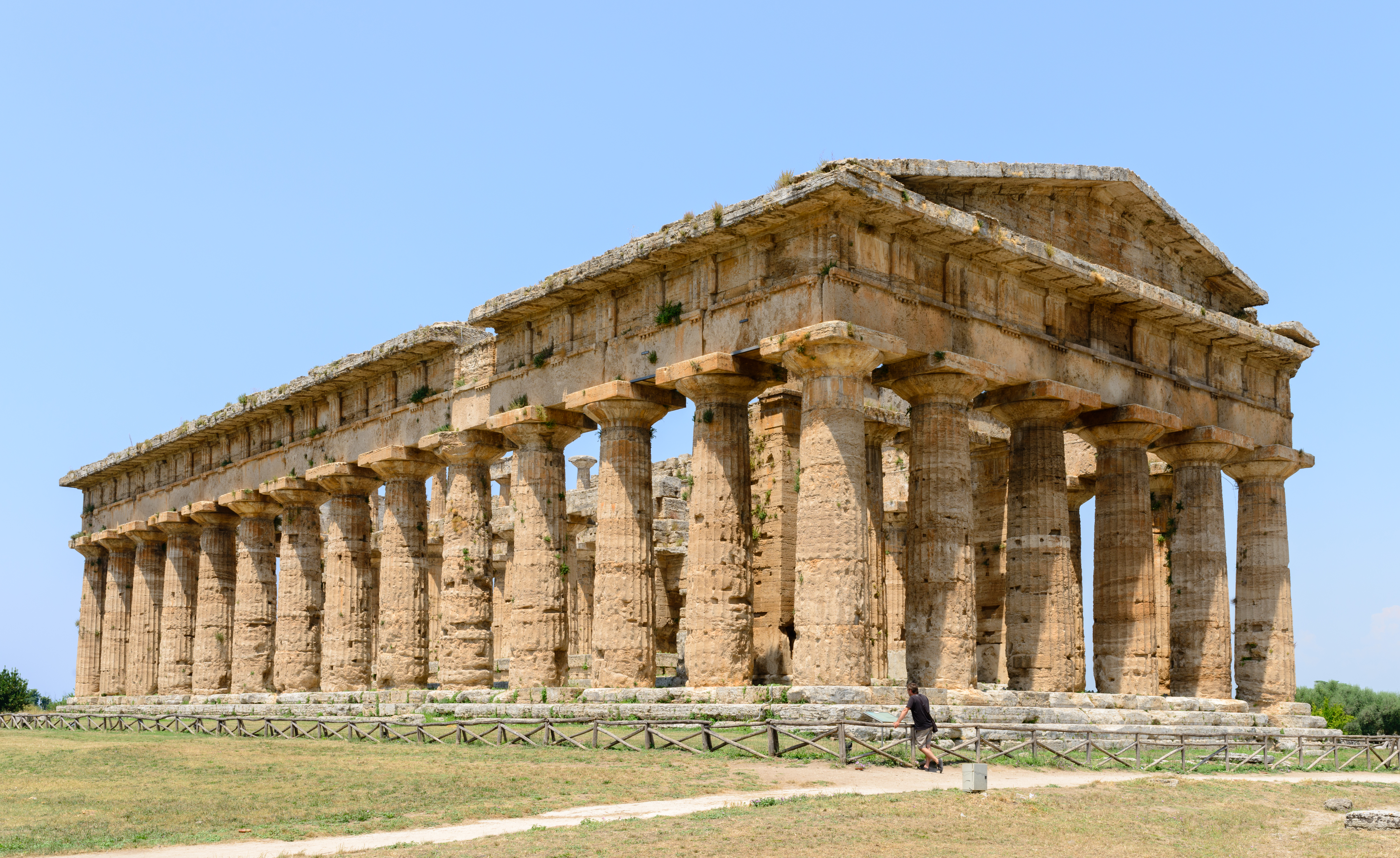
- Second temple of Hera

General information
- Location: Paestum, Campania
- Completed: c. 450 BC

UNESCO World Heritage Site
- Part of: "Paestum, Velia, the Certosa di Padula, Mount Cervati and the Vallo di Diano" part of Cilento and Vallo di Diano National Park with the Archeological Sites of Paestum and Velia, and the Certosa di Padula
- Criteria: Cultural: (iii), (iv)
- Reference: 842-001
- Inscription: 1998 (22nd Session)

The Temple of Hera II (also erroneously called the Temple of Neptune or of Poseidon), is a Greek temple of Magna Graecia in Paestum, Campania, Italy. It was built in the Doric order around 460–450 BC, just north of the first Hera Temple of around 550–525 BC.

The name "Temple of Neptune" is a misnomer from the 18th century, it is now thought it was actually dedicated to the goddess Hera, although it is possible that Poseidon (Neptune to the Romans) was also a dedicatee.

A. W. Lawrence described it as "the best preserved of all Greek temples". It was listed as a UNESCO World Heritage Site in 1998. The Temple is located at 40.41982° N, 15.005695° E.

== Description ==
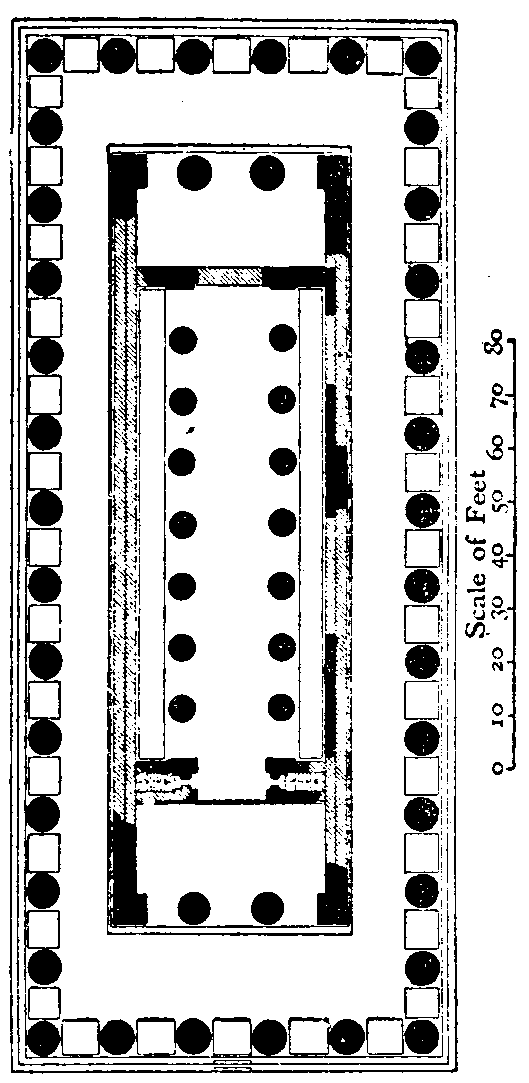
Plan of the second temple of Hera

The temple measures 24.46 by 59.98 metres, with six external columns along its shorter sides and fourteen columns along its longer sides (counting the corner columns twice). These are 8.88 metres high (29 feet), and the columns at the ends taper from a diameter of nearly 7 feet at the bottom to about 5 feet at the top; the columns on the sides taper by less. This gives a ratio of height to lower diameter of 4.25:1, unusually low for the period.

The temple, constructed of local very porous limestone, was concealed originally by a powdered marble stucco.

Instead of the 20 flutes normal for Doric order column by this date, the large external columns have 24 flutes, the smaller lower columns in the cella 20, and the still smaller upper ones on the architraves 16. The Temple of Hera II also has a wider column size and smaller intervals between columns. The entasis, or curve, of its columns give a stronger visual presence. This temple is aligned with a double peaked mountain considered to be sacred by the Greeks.

The temple was also used to worship Zeus and another deity, whose identity is unknown. There are visible on the east side the remains of two altars, one large and one smaller. The smaller one is a Roman addition, built when a road leading to a Roman forum was cut through the larger one.

It also is possible that the temple originally was dedicated to both Hera and Poseidon; some offertory statues found around the larger altar are thought to demonstrate this identification.

The Temple of Hera II resembles the Temple of Zeus at Olympia, of the same period. With the other temples at Paestum it is one of the best preserved early Greek temples.

== Gallery ==
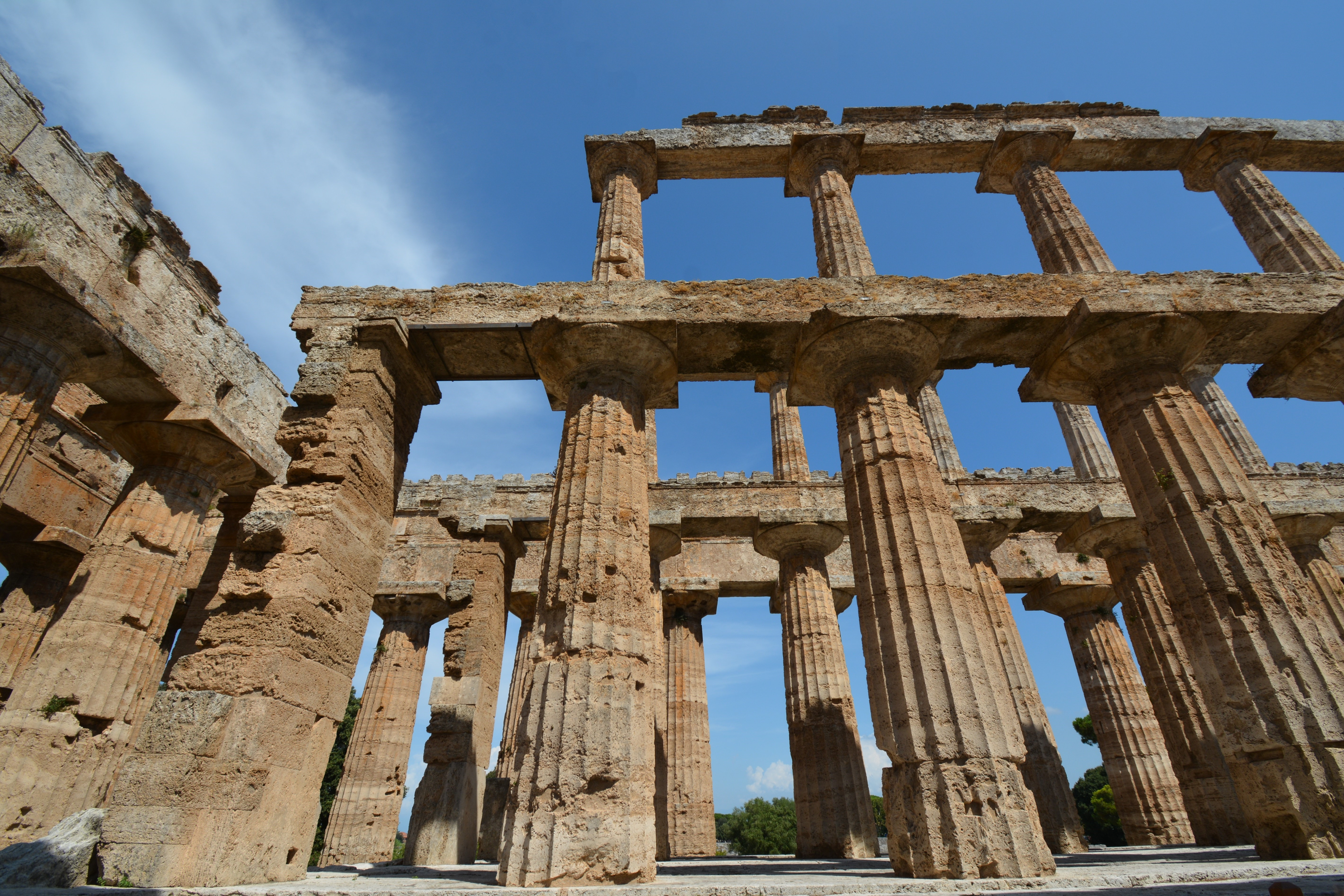
Across the cella

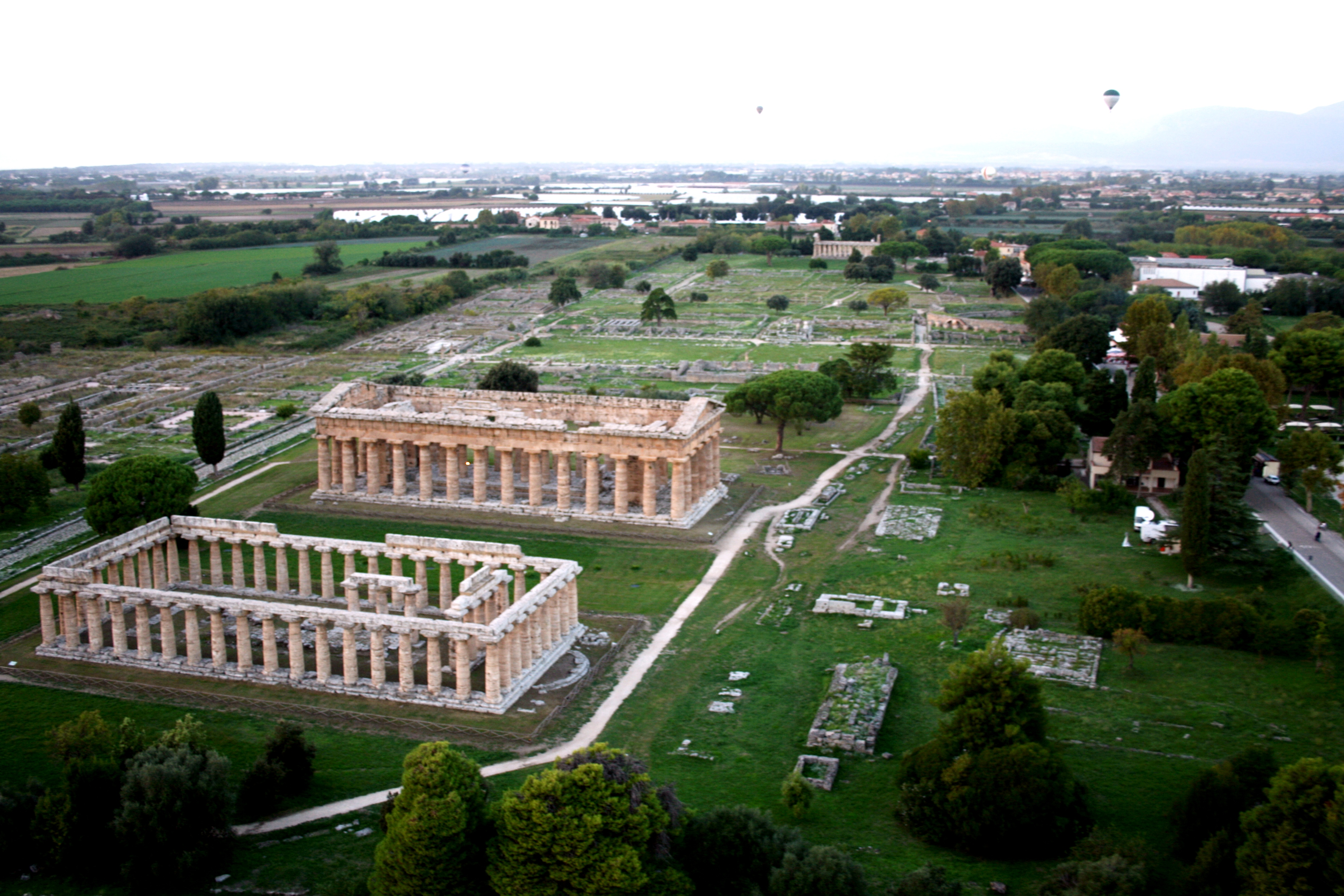
the First and Second Hera temples, the ruins of the city centre, and the Temple of Athena in the distance

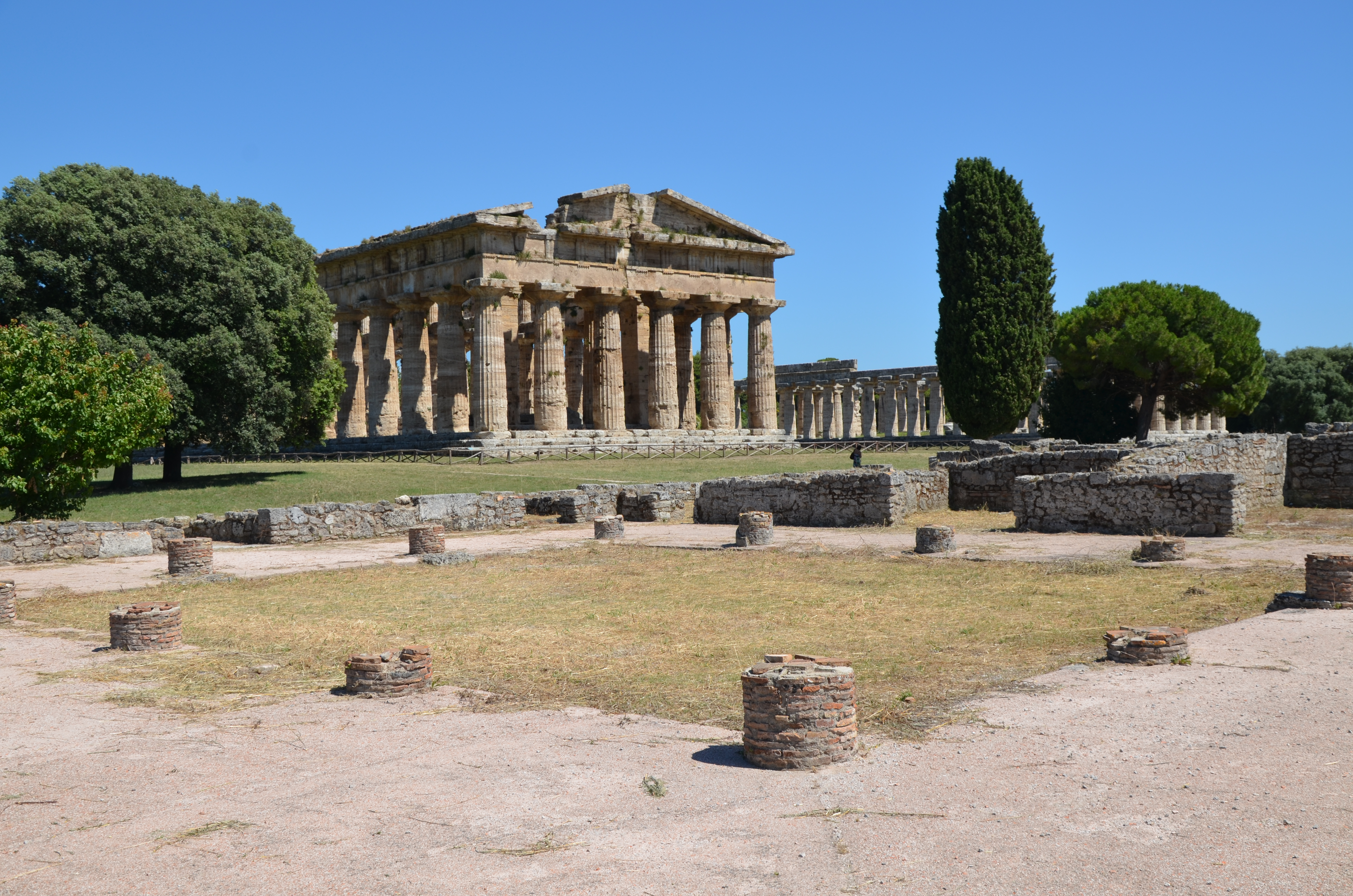
The archaeological area around

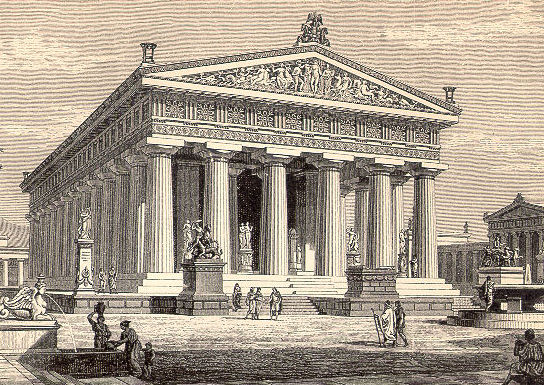
Reconstruction of the second temple of Hera from Pierer's Universal-Lexikon, 1891.

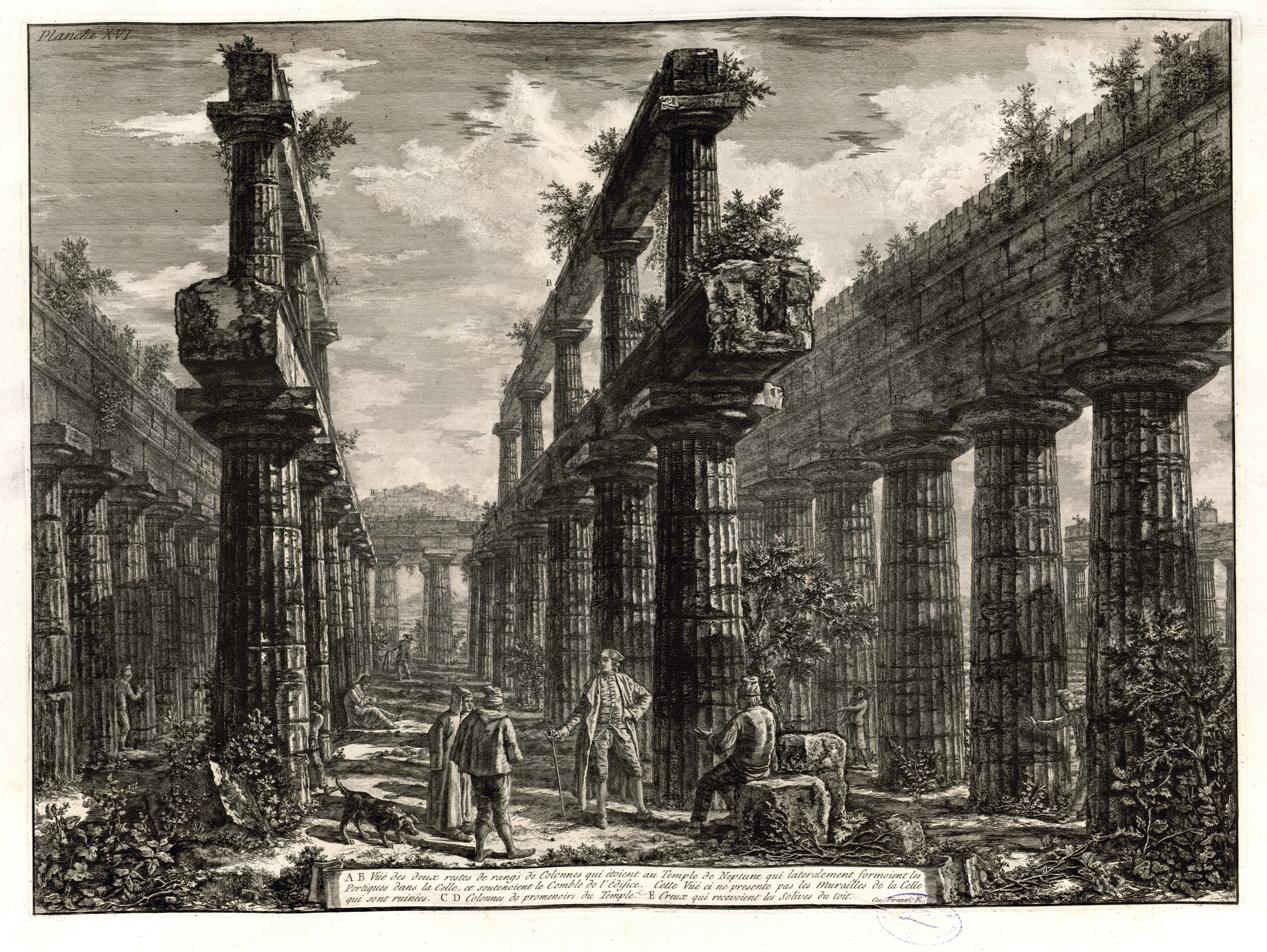
Etching by Giovanni Battista Piranesi, 1778
