= Siano (surname) =

Siano is a surname. Notable people with the surname include:

- Alessandro Siano (born 2001), Italian footballer
- Joe Siano, American vocalist
- Michele Siano (born 1991), Italian footballer
- Nicky Siano (born 1955), American DJ
- Tony Siano (1907–1986), American football player

== See also ==
- Sano (surname)
