= Paestum railway station =

Railway station in Paestum, Italy

Paestum
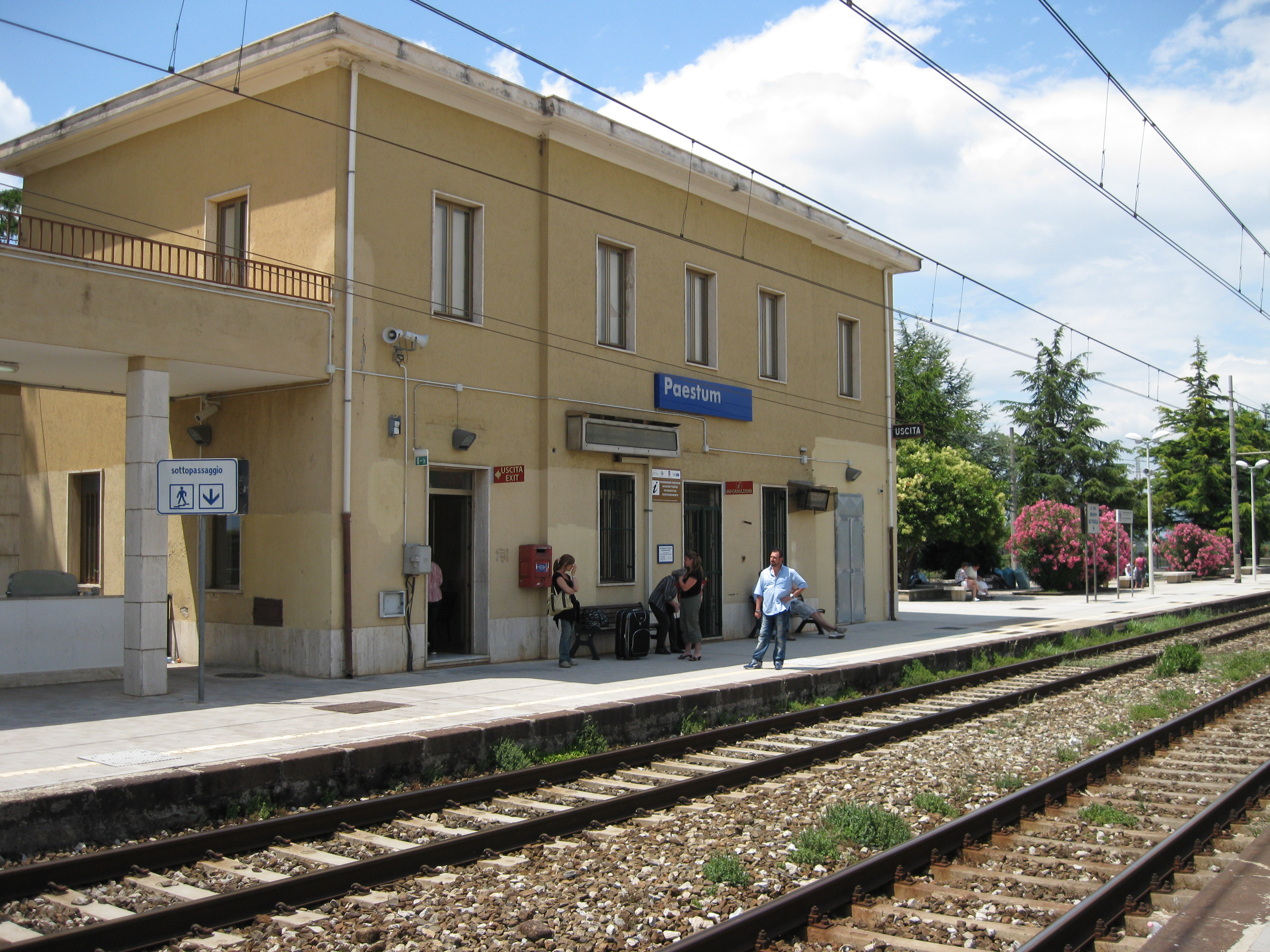

General information
- Other names: Pesto
- Location: Paestum; Capaccio Paestum; Italy
- Coordinates: 40.421738°N 15.014695°E

History
- Opened: 1883, 1936

Other services
city buses
Location
- Location within Campania Location within Italy

Paestum station is a train station in Italy of the Salerno–Reggio di Calabria railway located near the Paestum archaeological site and about one kilometre from the National Archaeological Museum of Paestum, in the municipality of Capaccio Paestum.

It is served by almost all regional trains and some InterCity. The plant is classified by RFI in the "Silver" category, currently under restoration within the Pegasus project.

== History ==
The Pesto station was inaugurated in 1883, and was renamed Paestum in 1927.

The current station was inaugurated in 1936 on the occasion of a visit to the site of the ancient Poseidonia by King Victor Emmanuel III of Italy and Benito Mussolini.

== Architecture ==
The station has a two-level building. The municipality of Capaccio has taken possession of the ground floor to prevent it from being closed by the Ferrovie dello Stato and intends to re-evaluate it. Various period pieces of furniture from the 20 years of Fascism are kept in the station.

According to the plans, the railway station will also host an artistic center that will welcome the works of artists who want to exhibit their masterpieces in Paestum; a waiting room will also be set up for all tourists traveling by train.

== Bibliography ==
- Rete Ferroviaria Italiana, Fascicolo Linea 142 (Line 142 File).

== See also ==
- History of rail transport in Italy
- List of railway stations in Campania
- Rail transport in Italy
- Railway stations in Italy
