= Heraion at Foce del Sele =

Archaeological site in southwestern Italy

Coordinates: 40.4885°N 14.9697°E

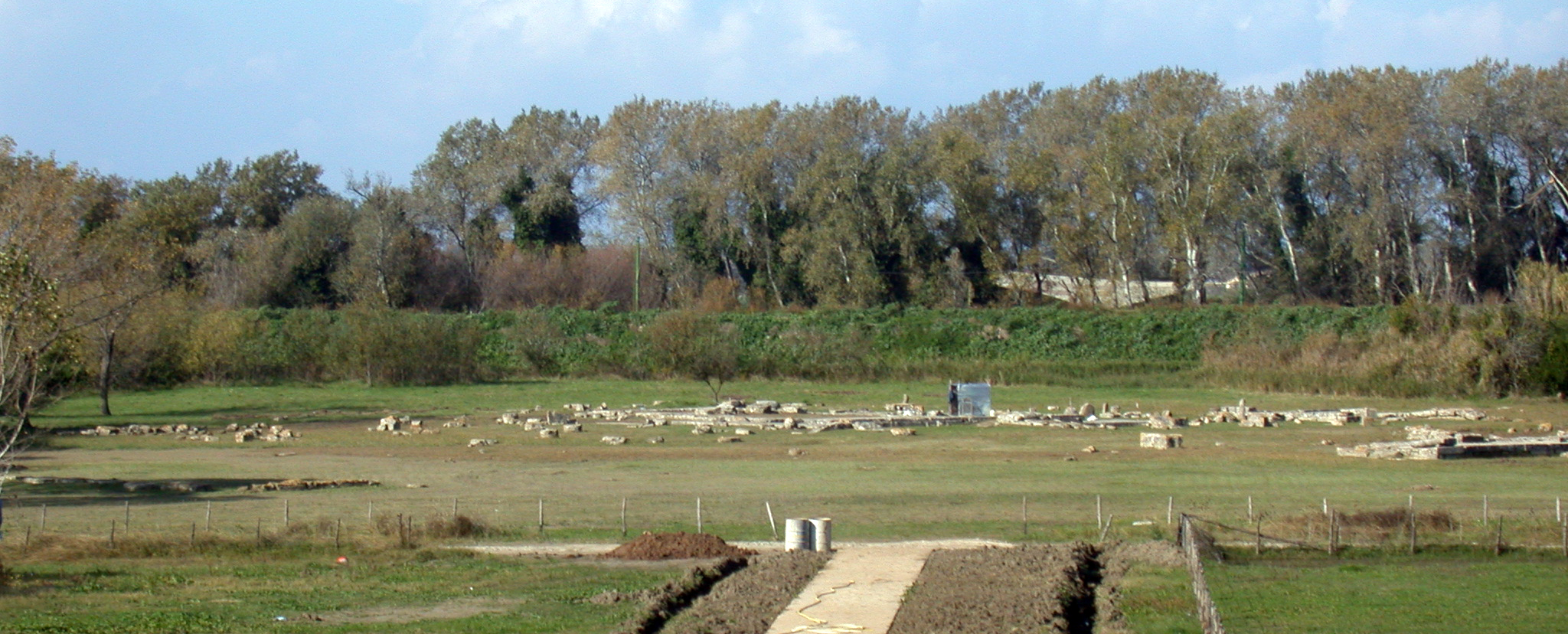
The remains of the sanctuary to Argive Hera at the mouth of the Sele, Heraion at Foce del Sele

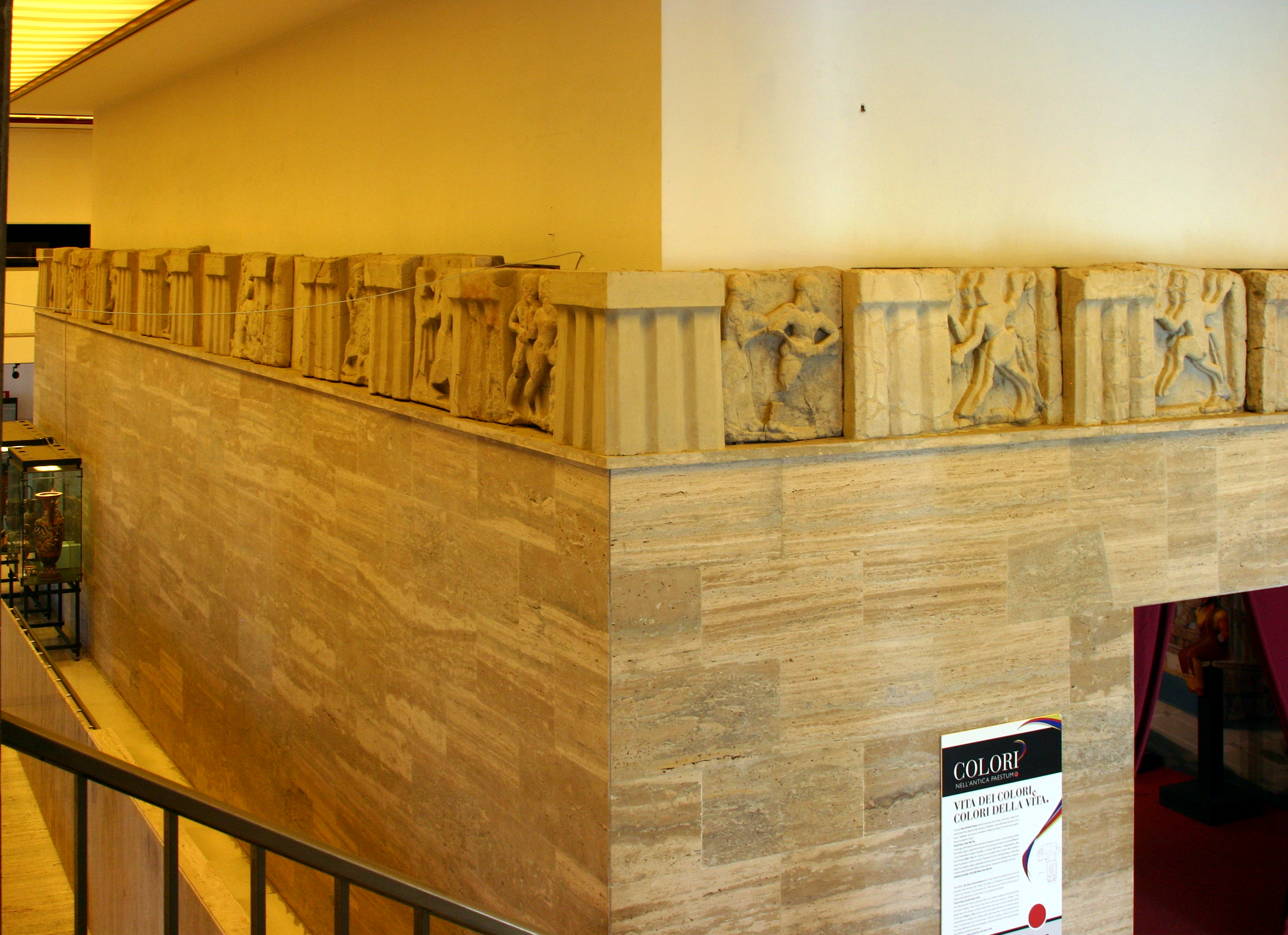
Early metope sections as displayed in the National Archaeological Museum of Paestum

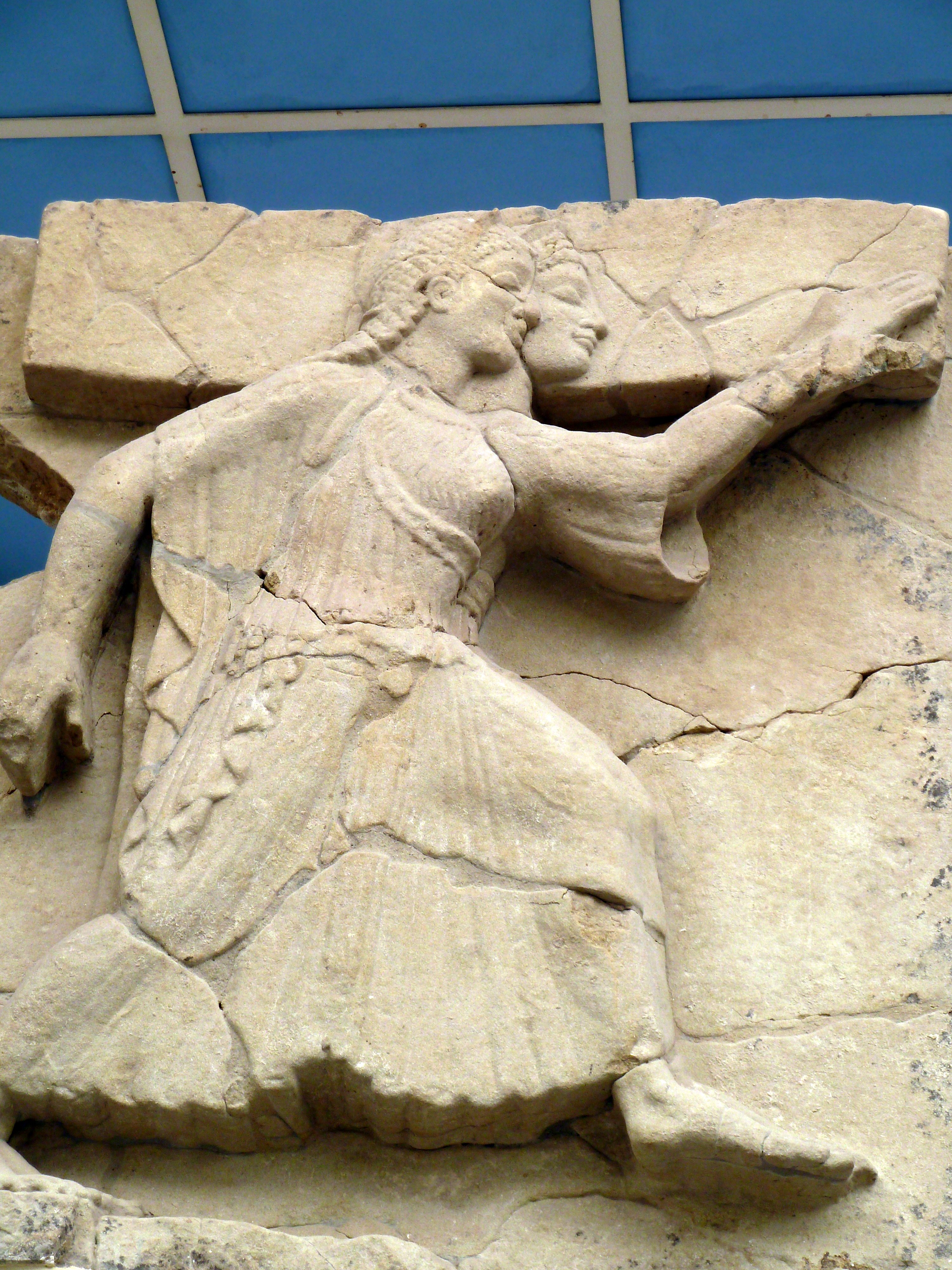
Dancing maidens from the later group of metope reliefs, c. 510 BC

The Heraion at Foce del Sele (English "Heraion at the mouth of the River Sele") is an archaeological site consisting of an Ancient Greek sanctuary complex dedicated to the goddess Hera in what was Magna Graecia. When built, the complex was located at the mouth of the Sele, approximately 8 km (5.0 mi) north of the Greek city of Poseidonia that was famous for its three standing Greek temples. Due to the deposition of alluvial sediment by the river, the site now is approximately 2.3 km (1.4 mi) from the modern coast.

The site is in the modern Italian comune of Capaccio-Paestum, some 40 km (25 mi) south of Salerno.

Construction at the complex is dated from the sixth to at least the third centuries BC. The sanctuary included a Greek temple and other buildings. It was located in the countryside rather than in an urban development and may have included buildings to accommodate pilgrims.

During the Middle Ages most of the stones were scavenged for use elsewhere as building materials or for other purposes. At one point, the best surviving pieces, including approximately 70 sixth-century metope reliefs, were excavated and moved to a museum at Paestum and very little was left at the original site other than the lowest courses of the buildings.

A modern "museo narrante" has been built at the site with video displays to explain and project reconstructions of the site.

== Ancient references ==
Although the existence of the sanctuary is reported by ancient historical sources, for a long time its location was not corroborated by other evidence. Differing ancient references made the rediscovery of the remains difficult. Strabo, attributed the foundation of the complex to Jason during the expedition of the Argonauts and he described the location of the Sanctuary of Argive Hera at the northern border of Lucania, on the left bank of the river Sele, about fifty stades from the city of Paestum. Pliny the Elder, however, described the location of the sanctuary as being on the opposite bank of the river. The path of the river changed with time as well. Finally, the site was discovered and confirmed the ancient reports of its existence.

== History ==
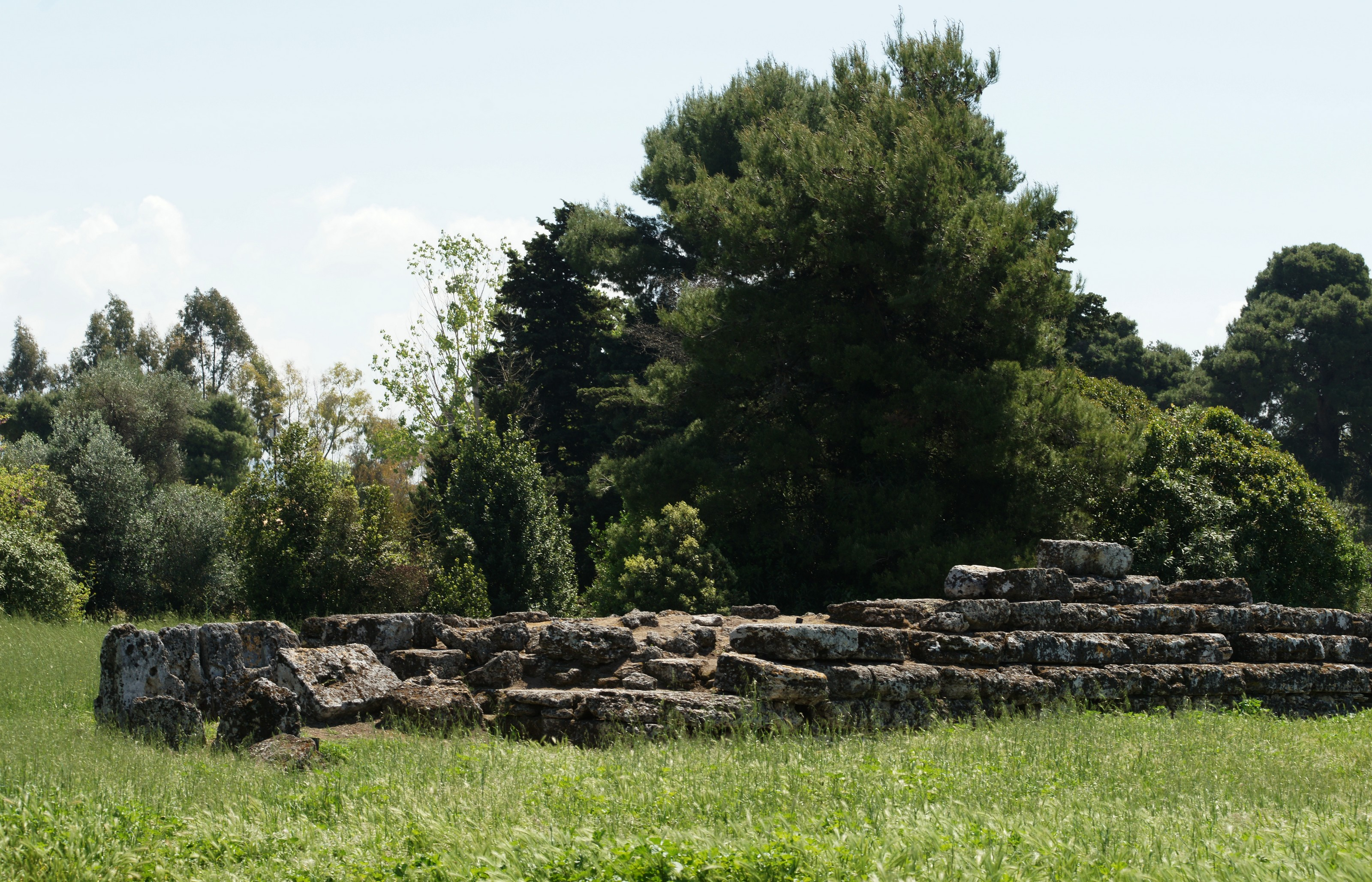
Remains of an altar-platform

The ancient sanctuary was founded at the beginning of the sixth century BC by the Greek colony at Paestum who originally were from further south at Sybaris. They dedicated the sanctuary to Argive Hera, the Greek goddess of women and marriage, as well as of navigation. At that time, the Sele River represented a boundary between Greek and Etruscan areas of influence.

Initially cult activities must have been performed in the open, in a sacred area equipped with an altar and bounded by porticos for hosting pilgrims. At the end of the sixth century, a grand temple was built, which probably was octastyle (with a facade of eight columns) and peripteral. At the same time, two other buildings were built some distance in front of the temple.

After the takeover of Paestum and the area by the local Lucanian people at the end of the fifth century BC, the sanctuary reached its highest cultural peak, with the reuse of more ancient materials for the construction of new buildings: a new portico and then a meeting house. At a certain distance, a square building was built, in which many loom weights have been found. Based upon the known cultural traditions of the time and these, it is theorised that in this building during each year, women about to be married would weave a new peplos dress that was offered to the cult statue of the goddess at an annual procession. Among the artefacts found at the sanctuary is a marble statue of Hera, seated on a throne with a pomegranate in her hand.

In 273 BC, the area was absorbed by the Roman Republic, who turned Paestum into a colonia. The weaving building was destroyed and a wall was built around the sacred area. The sanctuary survived in a slow decline until the second century AD. The area silted up and eventually memory of the site was lost beyond the local area.

The cult of Hera survived through all of these changes in a Christianised form as the Madonna del Granato (Madonna of the Pomegranate), whose cult in the vicinity of the sanctuary recalls the depiction of Hera with the pomegranate.

The sanctuary was brought to light by the excavations of the archaeologists Umberto Zanotti Bianco and Paola Zancani Montuoro between 1934 and 1940.

== Metopes ==
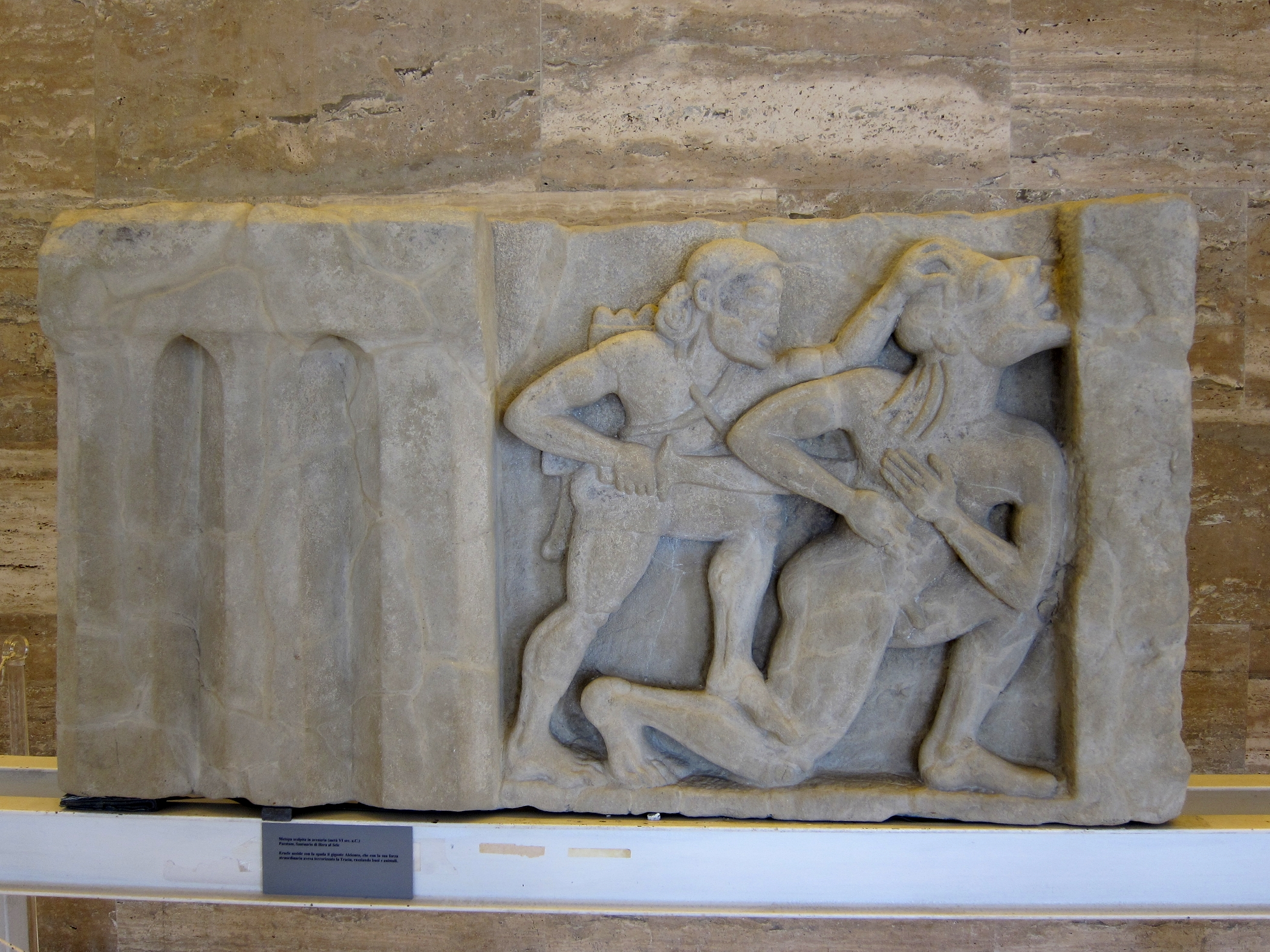
Heracles kills Alcyoneus, among the early group of metopes

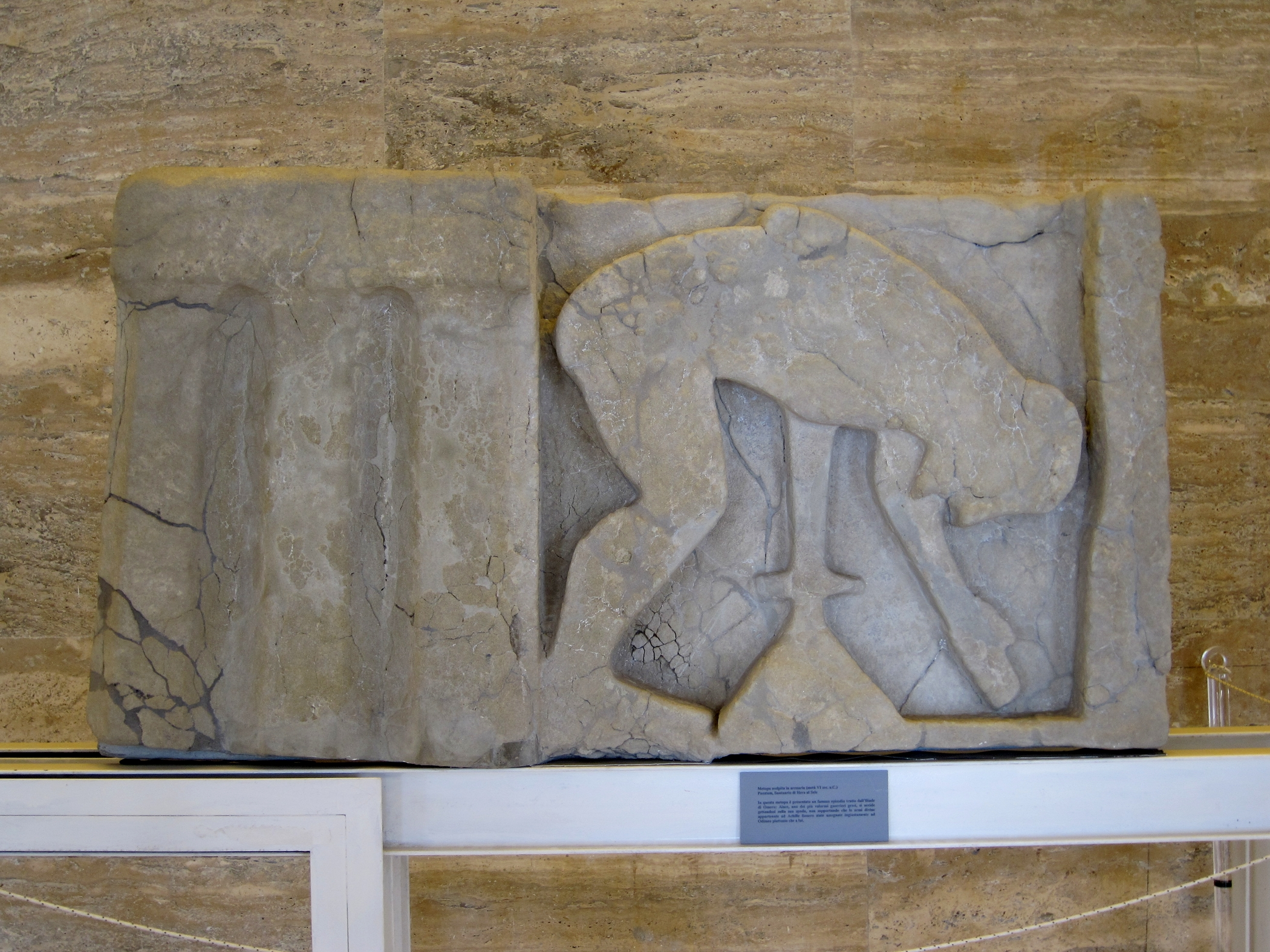
Suicide of Ajax, among the early group of metopes, one of the sections was only carved in outline

Approximately seventy metope reliefs carved in local sandstone have been recovered during excavations. They had been broken up, often into small fragments, and had to be pieced back together like a jigsaw puzzle. Thirty-eight of these belong to a more ancient group (second half of the sixth century) and must have decorated buildings that cannot now be reconstructed. They would have decorated a much earlier building that was lost to renovations at the site. Once it was thought that these early metopes came from a rectangular building presumed to be a treasury, but excavations demonstrated that the treasury was built much too late for the style of the reliefs. The metopes of this early group depict episodes from the Twelve Labours of Heracles, the Trojan War, and the lives of Jason and Orestes.

Most of the early group of metopes were carved in sections, consisting of a triglyph on the left and a relief panel with figures on the right, all on a single piece of stone. The more recent group of approximately thirty metopes from the main or second temple, depict young maidens dancing in bas-relief, reflecting the emphasis of the sanctuary cult on marriage. These date from around 510 BC. In the second group each figure panel was a separate piece of stone. Some panels from both groups are very badly worn.

The local stone is coarse and not suitable for carving detail. If only for this reason the figures in the reliefs are lightly modelled and relatively flat, but around their outlines the stone has been deeply cut back. Some have only the outline deeply carved, with the figures blank and flat. These may have been unfinished, or intended only to be painted. It is likely that all the reliefs were painted in bright colours. The muscularity of the figures is comparable to the style of sculptures from Sybaris, from which the members of the founding colony had migrated.

Although the three main Greek temples at Paestum are still standing, none of them had sculpted reliefs resembling these; perhaps painted scenes, now lost, substituted for them.

As those of Temple C at Selinus, the triglyphs are strongly projecting and are the same size as the metopes. The indentations visible on the rear of the metopes show that they were inserted between the triglyphs after the installation of the wooden beams. According to an archaeologist describing them, Roland Martin, these thirty-eight metopes of the older period would have decorated a Treasury (Thesauros) that he describes as having a rectangular floor plan and a Doric facade with two columns in antis; the capitals of the doric columns would have contrasted with the Ionic capitals of the antae; the doric frieze having no structural function, would have been placed in front of the wooden beams that supported the roof. However, excavations under the treasury building now suggest that this was built much too late to have been where the early metopes were displayed. Current archaeological research now suggests that the early metopes adorned an earlier temple on the site, referred to as "Hera I".

The metopes are now in the National Archaeological Museum of Paestum, which was built in 1950 to house these discoveries and those from Paestum. Their arrangement in the museum follows the presumption at that time of an early treasury building and as they were thought to have decorated it, rather than an early temple.

The identification of some subjects among the metopes and the extent to which the ensemble reflects a coherent programme, have continued to be discussed by scholars as excavations reveal more accurate evidence.

== Votive gifts ==
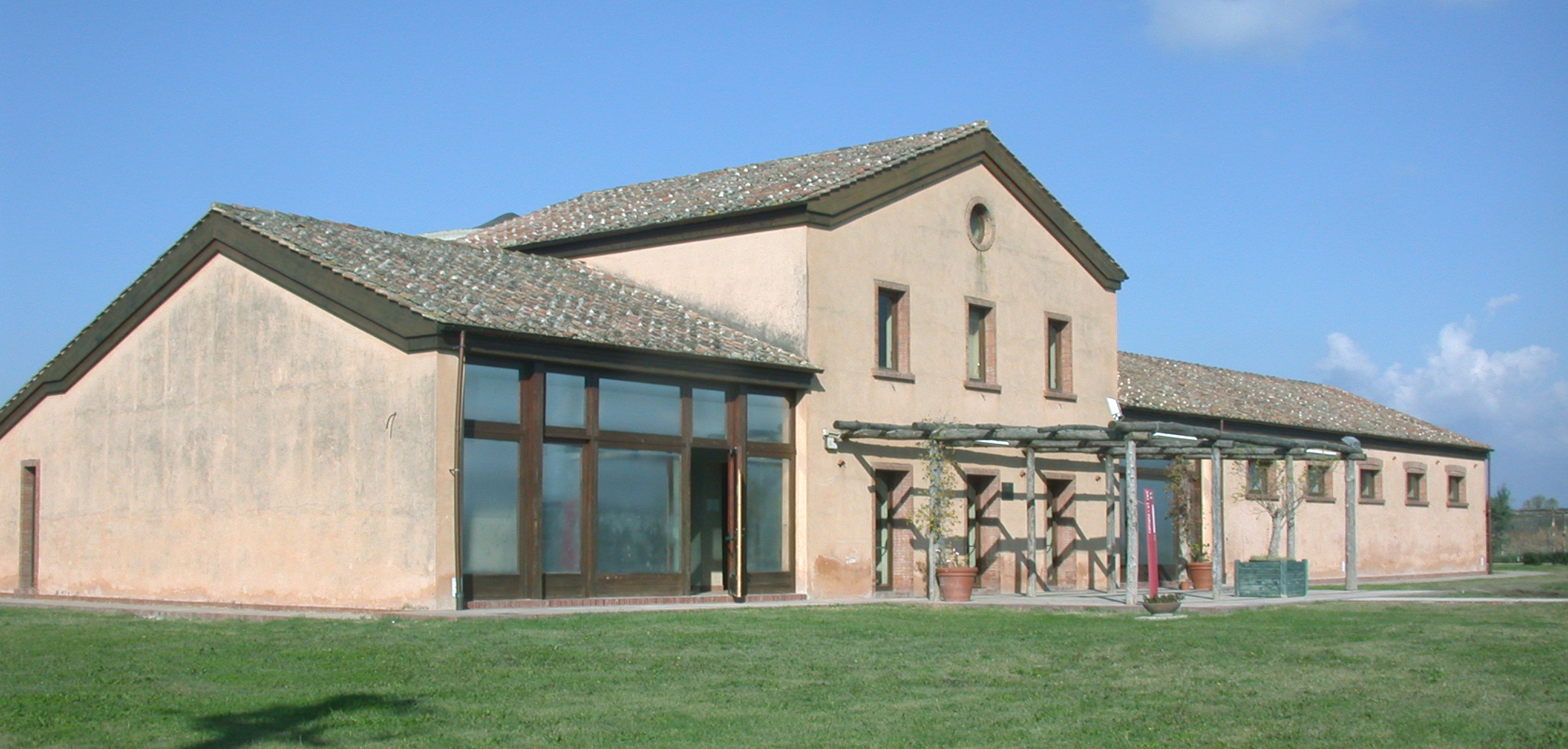
The Museo Narrante del Santuario di Hera alla Foce del Sele

Artefacts found during excavations of the sanctuary have included a large number of buried votive offerings (mostly terracotta statuettes of the goddess) that were buried some time after being left at the shrine. A large portion of these votives are on display at the site of the sanctuary in the Museo Narrante del Santuario di Hera alla Foce del Sele, located in a reconstructed farm house (the masseria Procuriali).

A first deposit was found near the temple and was made up of five ditches lined by stone slabs and covered with stone as well. These artefacts were deposited between the sixth and second centuries BC. Some evidence of burning relates to the sacrifices offered at the times of the burials.

A second deposit consisting of one large ditch also was discovered. It contained approximately six thousand artefacts, including terracotta statues and small bronze objects, dating from burials between the fourth and second centuries BC. Some coins from the second century AD that were deposited in a flood were also found there.

== Bibliography ==
- "The Sanctuary at the mouth of the River Sele", www.paestum.org.uk
- The Frieze from the Hera I Temple at Foce del Sele by Frances Dodds Van Keuren
- Charbonneaux, Jean; Martin, Roland; François, Villard (1969). La Grecia arcaica: (620-480 a.C.). Milano: Rizzoli. [ISBN unspecified]
- Paola Zancani Montuoro; Umberto Zanotti Bianco (1951). Heraion alla Foce del Sele. Roma: Istituto Poligrafico dello Stato.
