= Triglyph =

Vertically channeled tablets of the Doric frieze in classical architecture

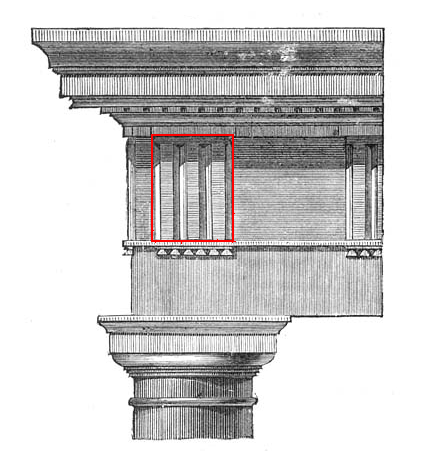
Triglyph centered over the last column in the Roman Doric order of the Theater of Marcellus

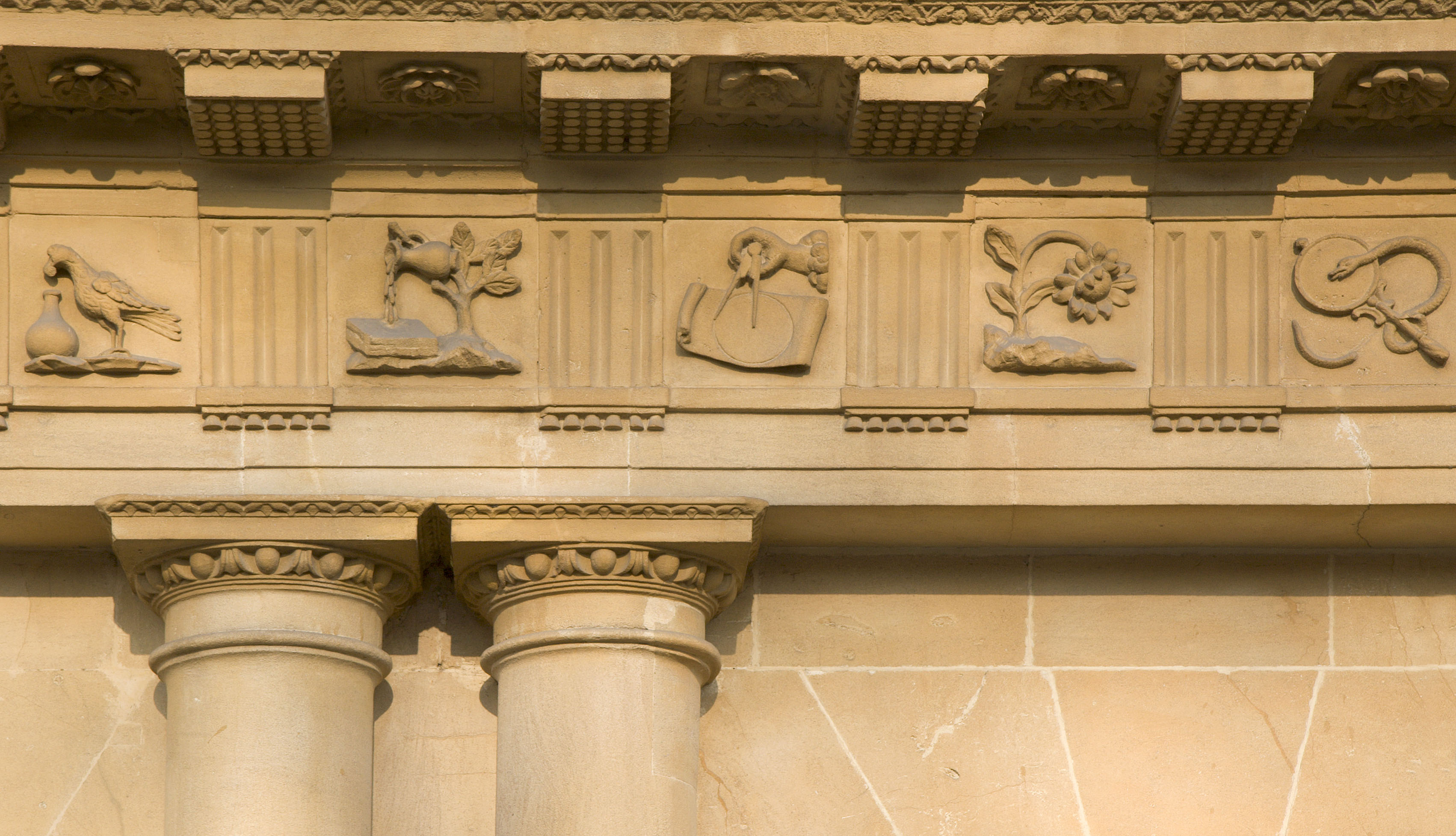
John Wood's The Circus Bath, Somerset (1754), triglyphs and decorated metopes

In classical architecture, a triglyph is a vertically channeled tablet of the Doric frieze, so called because of the angular channels in them. The rectangular recessed spaces between the triglyphs on a Doric frieze are called metopes. The raised spaces between the channels themselves (within a triglyph) are called femur in Latin or meros in Greek. In the strict tradition of classical architecture, a set of guttae, the six triangular "pegs" below, always go with a triglyph above (and vice versa), and the pair of features are only found in entablatures of buildings using the Doric order. The absence of the pair effectively converts a building from being in the Doric order to being in the Tuscan order.

The triglyph is largely thought to be a tectonic and skeuomorphic representation in stone of the wooden beam ends of the typical primitive hut, as described by Vitruvius and Renaissance writers. The wooden beams were notched in three separate places in order to cast their rough-cut ends mostly in shadow. Greek architecture (and later Roman architecture) preserved this feature, as well as many other features common in original wooden buildings, as a tribute to the origins of architecture and its role in the history and development of man. The channels could also have a function in channeling rainwater.

== Structure and placing ==
In terms of structure, a triglyph may be carved from a single block with a metope, or the triglyph block may have slots cut into it to allow a separately cut metope (in stone or wood) to be slid into place, as at the Temple of Aphaea. Of the two groups of 6th-century metopes from Foce del Sele, now in the National Archaeological Museum of Paestum, the earlier uses the first method, the later the second. There may be some variation in design within a single structure to allow for corner contraction, an adjustment of the column spacing and arrangement of the Doric frieze in a temple to make the design appear more harmonious. In the evolution of the Doric order, the placing of the triglyphs evolved somewhat, especially at corners.

== Outside the Doric ==
The Temple B of Selinunte was built with Ionic columns and triglyphs and metopes in its entablature.

The Great Colonnade of Apamea have triglyphs and metopes on parts of entablature, although it was built in Corinthian order.

The interior of the Basilica of San Salvatore in Spoleto (8th century) has triglyphs and metopes at the Corinthian entablature.

In post-Renaissance architecture the strict conventions are sometimes abandoned, and guttae and triglyphs, alone or together, may be used somewhat randomly as ornaments. For example, the Baroque Černín Palace in Prague (1660s) has triglyphs and guttae as ornaments at the top of arches, in a facade using an eclectic Ionic order.

== Gallery ==
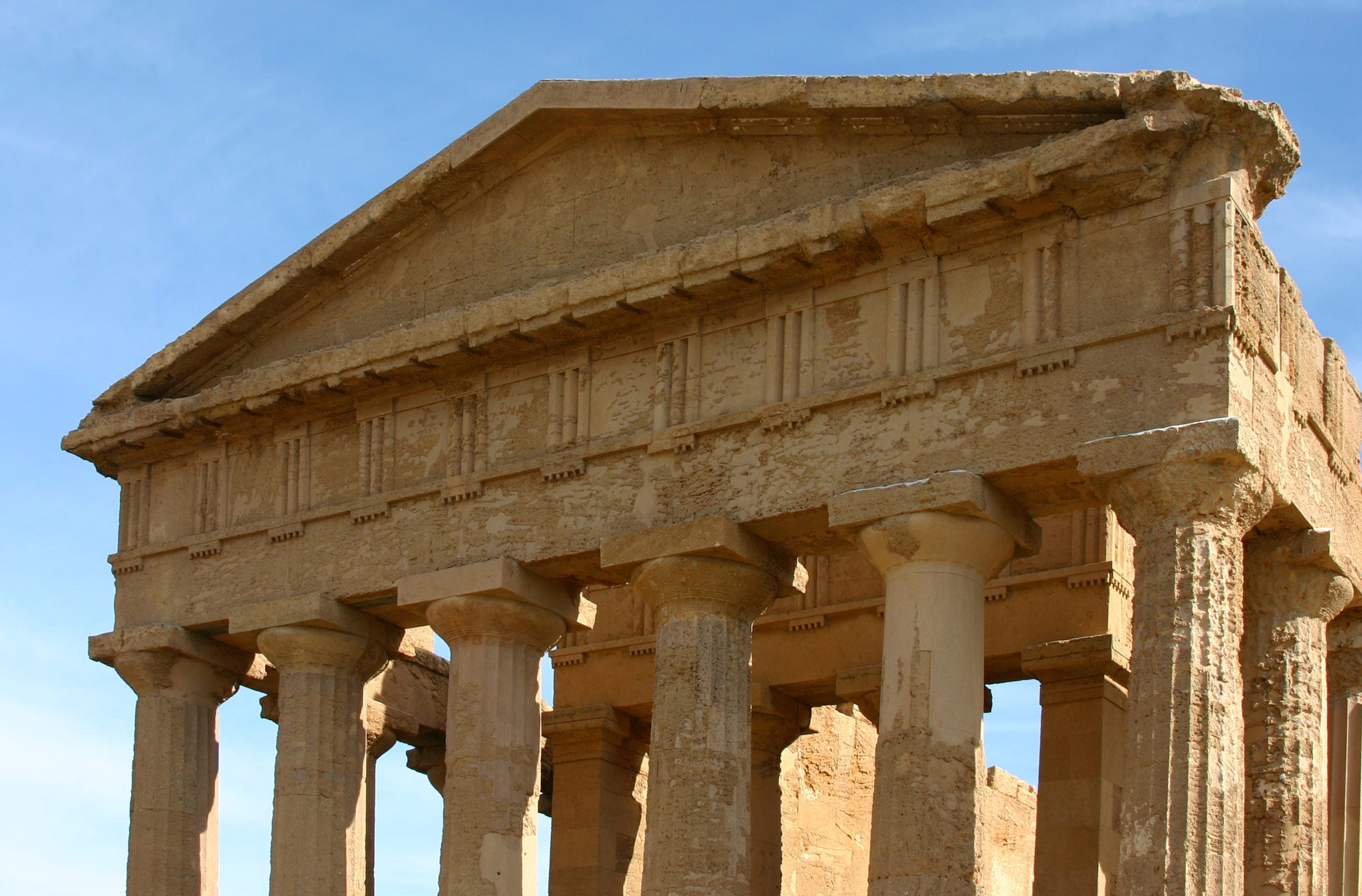
Temple of Concordia, Agrigento, Sicily, with plain metopes

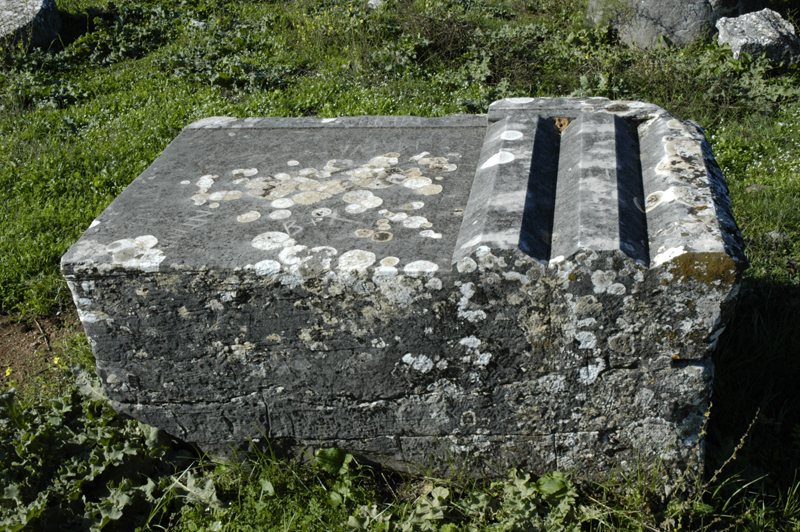
A metope (L) and triglyph (R) cut from one block from Stratos.

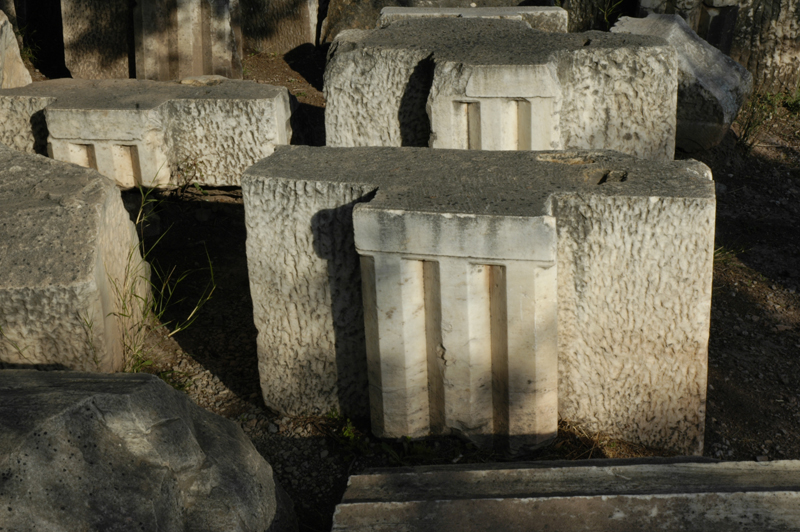
Triglyph blocks with slots for the insertion of metopes in the Marmaria at Delphi.

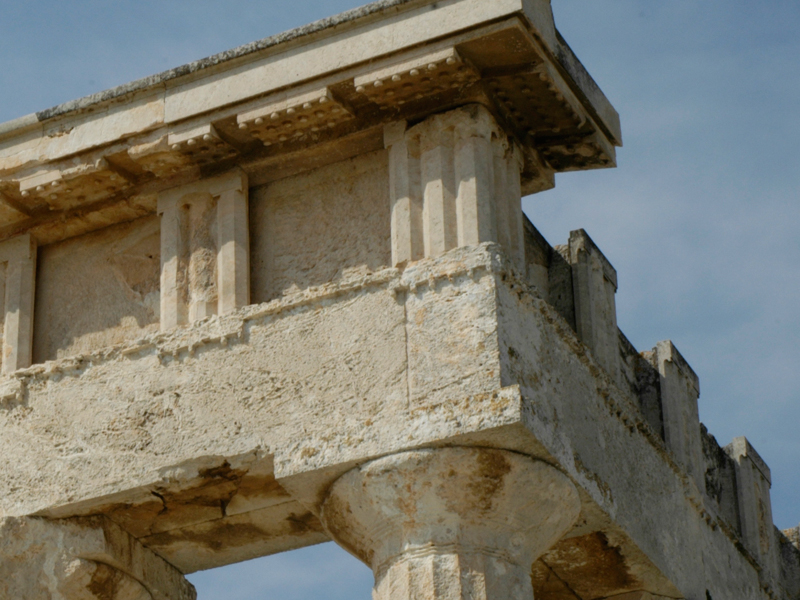
Triglyphs (slotted for the insertion of metopes) in the Doric frieze of the Temple of Aphaia.

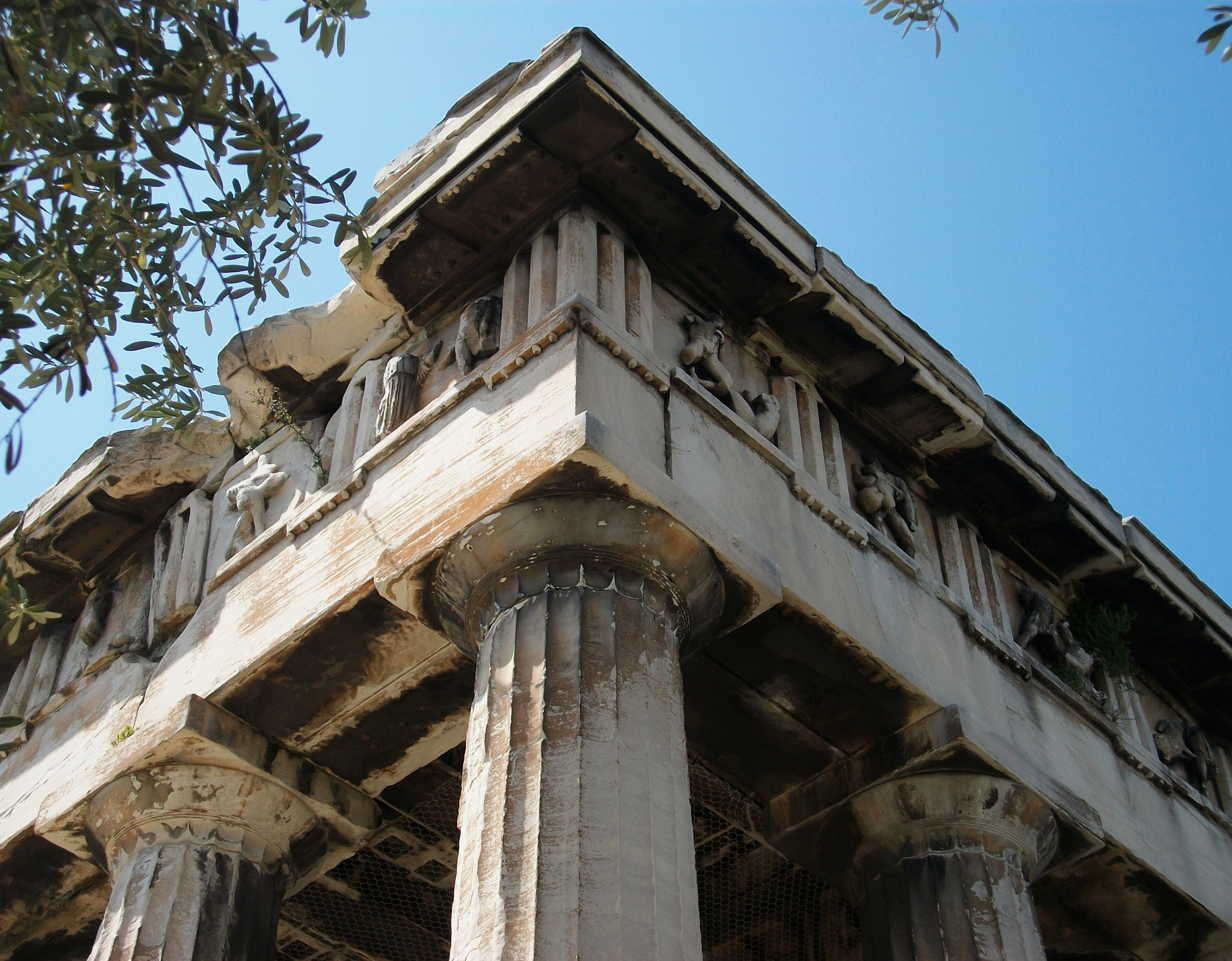
The entablature of the Hephaisteion in Athens, showing Doric frieze with triglyphs and sculpted metopes.

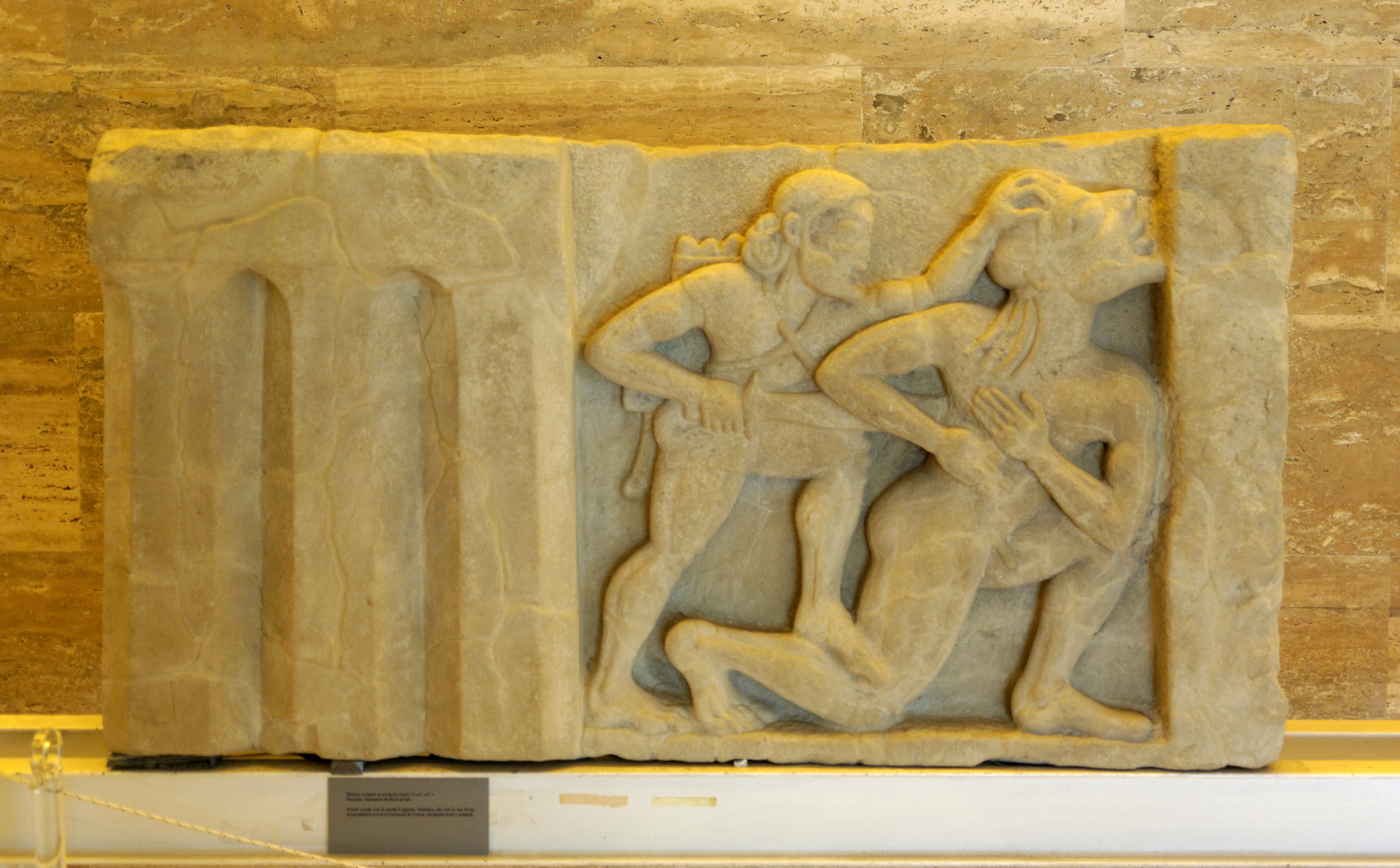
Section from Foce del Sele with metope and triglyph in one piece

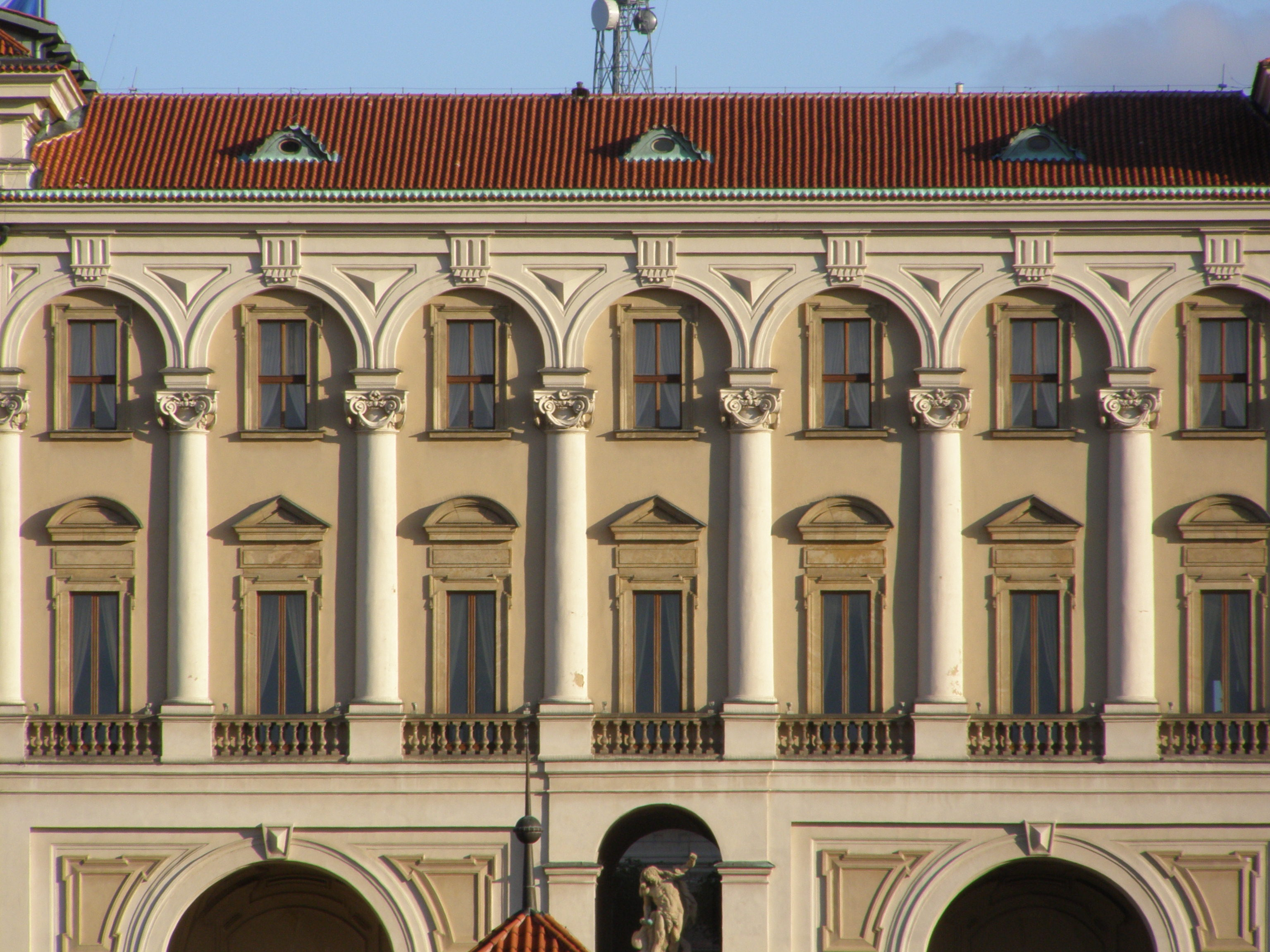
Černín Palace in Prague (1660s) has triglyphs and guttae as ornaments at the top of arches

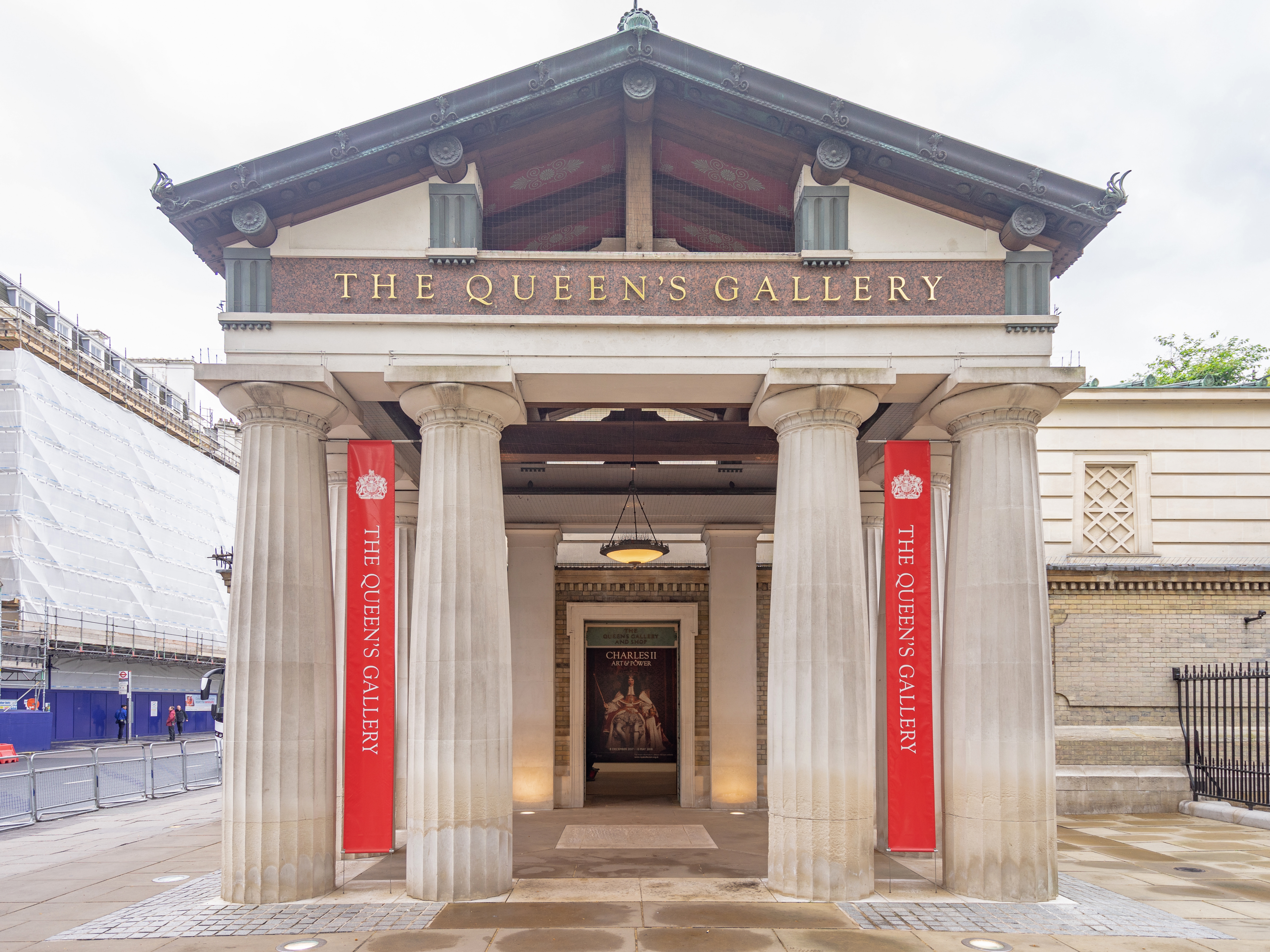
Triglyphs on the entrance of the Queen's Gallery, Buckingham Palace in London, 2000–2002

== See also ==
- Fascia (architecture)
