= Andrea Pelamatti =

Russian footballer (born 2004)

Personal information
- Date of birth: 9 October 2004 (age 22)
- Place of birth: Esine, Brescia, Italy
- Height: 1.68 m (5 ft 6 in)
- Positions: Left back; midfielder

Team information
- Current team: Cavese

Youth career
- –2023: Inter

Senior career*
Years	Team	Apps	(Gls)
2023–2024	Torres	5	(0)
2024	→ Recanatese (loan)	16	(1)
2024–2025	Caldiero Terme	24	(0)
2025–	Cavese	9	(0)
2026	→ Pro Palazzolo (loan)	12	(0)

International career^{‡}
2019	Italy U15	4	(0)
2020	Italy U16	1	(0)
2021	Russia U18	2	(0)
- * Club domestic league appearances and goals as of 3 May 2026 ‡ National team caps and goals as of 11 October 2021

Andrea Pelamatti (Russian: Андреа Пеламатти; born 9 October 2004) is a footballer who plays as a midfielder for Serie C Group C club Cavese. Born in Italy, he is a Russia youth international.

== Club career ==
As a youth player, Pelamatti joined the youth academy of Serie A side Inter.

On 28 July 2023, Pelamatti joined Serie C club Torres on a permanent transfer.

On 18 July 2024, Pelamatti signed a two-season contract with Caldiero Terme.

== International career ==
Pelamatti was born in Italy to an Italian father and a Russian mother, making him eligible to represent both countries internationally. After playing for Italy's under-15 and under-16 teams, he switched his allegiance to Russia in 2021 and received a call-up to their under-18 squad.
