= Cavese 1919 =

Italian football club

Cavese
- Full name: Cavese 1919
- Nicknames: Aquilotti (Eagle Scouts); Metelliani; Blufoncé (The Dark-blue)
- Founded: 1919; 107 years ago
- Ground: Stadio Simonetta Lamberti
- Capacity: 5,200
- Owner: Alessandro Lamberti
- Manager: Cristiano Masitto
- League: Serie C Group C
- 2025–26: Serie C Group C, 14th of 20
- Website: https://www.cavese1919.com/

Cavese 1919, commonly known as just Cavese, is an Italian football club based in Cava de' Tirreni, Campania, that currently plays in Serie C Group C. The first city club was founded in 1919 as Unione Sportiva Cavese. It was refounded as Pro Cavese in 1974. In 2012, the club, known as S.S. Cavese 1919 S.r.l. at that time, merged with another local side "U.S.D. Pro Cavese 1394", but retained the "Cavese 1919" brand. The club was most recently in Serie B in 1984.

== History ==
=== From U.S. Cavese, Pro Cavese to S.S. Cavese 1919 ===
The team was founded in 1919 as Unione Sportiva Cavese, and played its first match ever against Salernitana, ended in a 3–2 win for the Aquilotti. In 1922 the team merged with Libertas Sporting Club, another local team, in order to build a more competitive side. That same year, the team was admitted to the Prima Divisione (the equivalent of the nowadays' Serie A). After a few years near the bottom of the table, the death of their coach and an economic crisis lead to their demotion in 1925.

After languishing in the lower levels of Italian Football for 10 years, S.S. Cavese was promoted to the Prima Divisione (at that time became the 4th highest division) in 1937. With a new stadium Stadio Francis Palmentieri and star player Virgilio Levratto, the Aquilotti rose to the Serie C . However, in 1948 the club ran into more economic trouble, sending them back into the minor divisions. In 1964 the club played its way to the Serie D despite a 3-point penalty. In 1974, Cavese merged with Pro Salerno, another Serie D team, and renamed itself as Pro Cavese. After the merge, several new clubs were founded and named after "Pro Salerno" a few times. Pro Cavese returned to Serie C in 1977 and took back its original denomination in 1980.

In 1981, Cavese was able to gain its first (and only) promotion to Serie B. The first Serie B season for Cavese ended in a 15th place which allowed the team to avoid relegation. The 1982–83 Serie B season was the top season ever for the Campanian team in its whole history: in fact, Cavese was almost to reach promotion to Serie A, ending the first half of the season in a third placed, which would allow the promotion, and sixth at the end of the season. That championship is remembered especially for the crushing 2–1 victory in San Siro against A.C. Milan. The scorers were Joe Jordan for Milan, and Tivelli and Di Michele for Cavese. However, the next season Cavese relegated to Serie C1, and was not able to reach Serie B anymore. The team was even cancelled from Italian football in 1991, and readmitted in the Eccellenza Campania with the denomination S.S. Cavese 1919.

In the 2000s, Cavese went back to the professional Italian leagues and in the 2005–06 Serie C2 season it was able to win the division and come back to Serie C1. In the 2006–07 Serie C1 season, a third place in the regular season allowed Cavese to play the promotion playoffs: after a 5–2 defeat to Foggia in the first leg, Cavese nearly overturned it in the second leg, winning it 3–1 and being eliminated by a late Foggia goal during injury time.

They defeated Napoli 2–1 in a friendly match in the beginnings of 2009.

Starting from 2010, fans of the club also became the shareholders. Local photographer, Michele Angelo Sica, became the executive director (Italian: Amministratore unico).

In the end of 2010–11 Lega Pro Prima Divisione season (ex-Serie C1), Cavese relegated to Lega Pro Seconda Divisione (ex-Serie C2). But in July 2011, the club did not appeal against the exclusion of the first team from professional football by Co.Vi.So.C.

Sica also made a press release in August 2011, stating the logo and color of the club were used by others without approval. S.S. Cavese 1919 had a team participated in a local league Campionato Regionale di Attività Mista in 2011–12 season.

The membership of "S.S. Cavese 1919 S.r.l." in the Italian Football Federation was finally revoked in June 2016, despite the club already given the name of "Cavese 1919" to the phoenix club circa 2012.

=== From U.S.D. Pro Cavese 1394 to Cavese 1919 ===
In July 2012, another club, U.S.D. Pro Cavese 1394, homage to one of the previous name, Pro Cavese, signed an agreement with S.S. Cavese 1919 to act as a phoenix club. U.S.D. Pro Cavese 1394 also applied to play in 2012–13 Serie D. Circa 2013–14 season Pro Cavese was renamed to U.S.D. Cavese 1919, and then the current name Cavese 1919 in the late 2010s.

U.S.D. Pro Cavese 1394 was formerly known as A.S.D. Città de la Cava 1394 [sic], based in Cava de' Tirreni in 2011–12 Eccellenza Campania season. Cava won the national promotion play-offs of that division, but requires to deposit €31,000 for the actual spot in 2012–13 Serie D season. Before 2011, the team was known as Vis Sangiorgio [sic], based in Castel San Giorgio. A.S.D. Vis San Giorgio also participated in 2010–11 Eccellenza Campania. The club had yet another name A.S.D. Paestum Città dei Templi, based in Paestum frazione, Capaccio-Paestum (not to be confused with S.S. Akragas Città dei Templi), but the club was takeover by businessman from Castel San Giorgio in 2009, and proposed to rename to A.S.D. Città di Castel San Giorgio (not to be confused with other team of the city, such as A.S.D. Castel San Giorgio (registration number 620,901) and A.S.D. Castel San Giorgio Calcio (registration number 620,516)). Paestum was relegated in 2008–09 Eccellenza Campania season, but repêchage on 31 July 2009. Paestum was known as U.S. Poseidon before 2005–06 season (registration number 61,766), also based in Capaccio-Paestum.

Some fans of the original S.S. Cavese 1919, also founded another phoenix club "S.C.S.D. Cava United F.C." in 2014 (registration number 941,251), stating they are still fans of Cavese, but not agree with the club re-foundation by buying the sports title from other club. Cava United participated in Terza Categoria. While Poseidon, another predecessor of the current "Cavese 1919", was also re-founded as U.S. Poseidon 1958 in Capaccio-Paestum (registration number 620,531). Poseidon reached Promozione Campania in 2014. Another team, Aquilotto Cavese (registration number 934,893), was founded by a fans association Associazione Sogno Cavese in 2011, which also related to 2014 founded Cava United.

In April 2014, U.S.D. Cavese 1919 was penalized 3 points in 2013–14 Serie D season, while the Chairman (Italian: Presidente, lit. 'President') Salvatore Manna was banned from football for 1 year, for some misconducts. He resigned as the chairman in the same month.

Cavese 1919 promoted back to Serie C in 2018. The club was selected as one of the replacement of the teams that fails to register for 2018–19 Serie C. Cavese reached the finals of the promotion play-offs of 2017–18 Serie D Group H. But even as one of the winners of the play-offs (9 winners from 9 groups in total), it did not guarantee promotion.

== Colors and badge ==
Team colors are blue and white.

== Players ==
=== Current squad ===
As of 31 August 2026

Note: Flags indicate national team as defined under FIFA eligibility rules; some limited exceptions apply. Players may hold more than one non-FIFA nationality.

No.	Pos.	Nation	Player
1	GK	BRA	Rafael Juwer
2	DF	ITA	Pietro Asiatico (on loan from Atalanta)
4	MF	ITA	Elia Visconti
5	MF	NGA	Theophilus Awua
7	FW	GRE	Elios Minaj
8	MF	CIV	Adama Diarrassouba
9	FW	ITA	Thomas Alberti
10	FW	ITA	Giuseppe Fella
11	FW	ITA	Samuele Sava
12	GK	ITA	Valerio Boffelli
15	DF	ITA	Ivan Ponziglione
17	DF	ITA	Francesco Nunziata
20	MF	ITA	Gianluca Esposito
22	GK	ITA	Matteo Bertini
24	FW	ITA	Francesco Orlando

No.	Pos.	Nation	Player
25	DF	ITA	Manuel Peretti
26	DF	POL	Thiago Cionek
27	DF	ITA	Ciro Loreto
28	DF	ITA	Tommaso Mannucci
33	DF	ITA	Mirko Personeni (on loan from Atalanta)
46	MF	ITA	Giovanni Severino
47	MF	ITA	Giammaria Fiorin
61	MF	ITA	Francesco Maiolo (on loan from Catanzaro)
77	DF	ITA	Mattia Macchi
78	MF	ITA	Raffaele Maria Di Costanzo
82	FW	ITA	Gerardo Fusco
97	DF	ITA	Francesco Acerbo
—	DF	ITA	Ignazio Natale
—	DF	RUS	Andrea Pelamatti

=== Out on loan ===
Note: Flags indicate national team as defined under FIFA eligibility rules; some limited exceptions apply. Players may hold more than one non-FIFA nationality.

No.	Pos.	Nation	Player
—	GK	ITA	Simone Iuliano (at Sarnese until 30 June 2027)
—	DF	ITA	Daniele Bolcano (at Palmese until 30 June 2027)
—	DF	ITA	Luca Cappa (at Gelbison until 30 June 2027)
—	DF	ITA	Francesco Distratto (at Nissa until 30 June 2027)
—	DF	ITA	Carmine Imparato (at Ebolitana until 30 June 2027)
—	MF	ITA	Giovanni Aurino (at Siracusa until 30 June 2027)

No.	Pos.	Nation	Player
—	MF	GUI	Amara Konate (at Turris until 30 June 2027)
—	MF	ITA	Elvaris Suplja (at Francavilla until 30 June 2027)
—	FW	ITA	Federico D'Incoronato (at Paganese until 30 June 2027)
—	FW	BEL	Ibrahim Kargbo Jr. (at Afragolese until 30 June 2027)
—	FW	ITA	Stefano Amato (at Ebolitana until 30 June 2027)

== Club Officials ==
=== Board of directors ===
Role	Name
Owner	(Italy) Alessandro Lamberti
Honorary president	(Italy) Alfredo Lamberti
Vice presidents	(Italy) Marco Nagar e Angelo Piscitelli
CEO	(Italy) PierLuigi De Flammineis
General Advisor	(Italy) Marco Magari - William Trucillo
Secretary	(Italy) Giuseppe Pascarelli
General Manager	(Italy) Clemente Filippi
Sports Director	(Italy) Pietro Fusco
Team Manager	(Italy) Luca Bisogno
SLO	(Italy) Gianmarco Amato
Manager	(Italy) Riccardo Tanimi
Press officer	(Italy) Michele Lodato
Social Media Manager	(Italy) Luca Vitale
Sponsor manager	(Italy) Leo Di Marino
Youth manager	(Italy) Mario Terracciano
Youth secretary	(Italy) Simone De Maio

- Last updated: 3 April 2023
- Source:Board of directors

=== Current Technical staff ===
Role	Name
Head coach	(Italy) Emanuele Troise
Assistant coach	(Italy) Domenico Di Cecco
Goalkeeping coach	(Italy) Domenico Corcione
Fitness coaches	(Italy) Alberto Olianas (Italy) Antonio Piccolo
Match Analyst	(Italy) Lorenzo De Lista
Club doctor	(Italy) Catello Di Somma
Osteopath	(Italy) Maurizio Circiello
Masseur	(Italy) Francesco Ostieri
Kit Men	(Italy) Giovanni Rossi (Italy) Orazio Lambiase (Italy) Giuseppe Armentante

- Last updated: 3 April 2023
- Source:Technical staff

== Honours ==
- Serie D

Winners (1): 2002–2003

- Supercoppa di Serie C

Winners: 2006
