= Michele Siano =

Italian footballer

Personal information
- Date of birth: 9 April 1991 (age 35)
- Place of birth: Capaccio Scalo, Italy
- Position: Midfielder

Team information
- Current team: ASD San Luca

Youth career
- Cavese

Senior career*
Years	Team	Apps	(Gls)
2007–2011	Cavese	10	(0)
2011–2012	Pro Patria	12	(0)
2014	Sestri Levante	8	(0)
2014–2016	Agropoli	47	(2)
2016–2017	Battipagliese		
2017–2018	AC Locri 1909		
2018	Castrovillari	8	(0)
2018–2019	AC Locri 1909	12	(2)
2019	ASD Buccino Volcei		
2019–	ASD San Luca		
- * Club domestic league appearances and goals as of 15:01, 15 April 2020 (UTC)

Michele Siano (born 9 April 1991, in Capaccio Scalo) is an Italian football midfielder who currently plays for ASD San Luca.

== Career ==
In December 2019, Siano joined Eccellenza club ASD San Luca.

== See also ==
- Football in Italy
- List of football clubs in Italy
