= Tomb of the Diver =

Ancient Greece funerary artifact in Paestum, Italy

- Tomba del Tuffatore
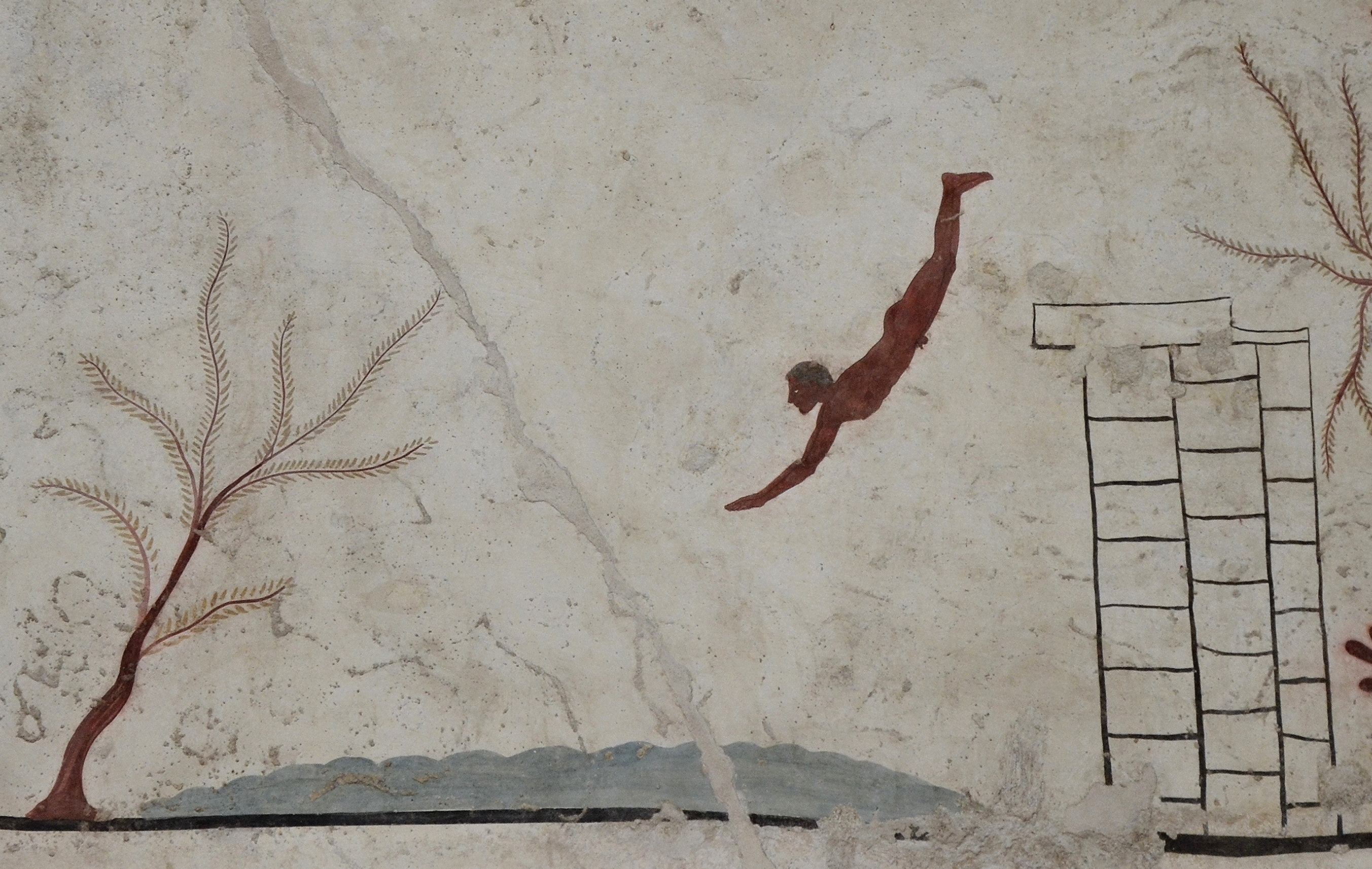
- Detail from the underside of the top slab of the grave, showing a man diving into waves .

- Location within Italy
- 40.4°N 15.0°E
- Location: Campania

History
- Built: 5th century BCE

Site notes
- Material: Local limestone
- Condition: Contents moved to National Archaeological Museum of Paestum
- Public access: to museum

The Tomb of the Diver (Italian: Tomba del tuffatore), now in the National Archaeological Museum of Paestum, is a frescoed tomb that dates to around 500 to 475 BCE, and is famous for the mysterious subject matter of the ceiling fresco, a lone diver leaping into a pool of water. The context of the tomb is disputed: there has been scholarly debate about whether the tomb was built by people from the nearby Greek settlement of "Poseidonia", now Paestum, or by an ancient Italic tribe living in the surrounding countryside. The tomb was built with five large stone slabs, each with a fresco attributed to one of two artists. The four walls are decorated with scenes of a symposium which is uncommon for a funerary context.

== Description ==
The Tomb of the Diver is an archaeological monument, built in about 500 to 475 BCE and found by the Italian archaeologist Mario Napoli on 3 June 1968 during his excavation of a small necropolis about 1.5 km south of the Greek city of Paestum in Magna Graecia, in what is now southern Italy. It is a grave made of five local limestone slabs forming the four lateral walls and the roof, the floor being excavated in the natural bedrock. The five slabs, carefully bonded with plaster, formed a chamber about 215 × 100 × 80 cm (7.1 × 3.3 × 2.6 ft) in size. All five slabs forming the monument were painted on the interior sides using a true fresco technique. The paintings on the four walls depict a symposium scene, while the cover slab shows the famous scene which gives the tomb its name: a young man diving into a curling and waving stream of water. The north and south walls of the tomb each display three chaise sofas occupied by five reclining figures, either guests of the symposium or hired entertainment for said guests. All reclining figures are adorned with crowns, and there are additional crowns available on the three legged tables for food and drink. The northern wall shows one guest on the leftmost couch engaging in kottabos, an ancient game of tossing wine from a cup at a target. On the rightmost couch, a display of pederasty shows a young man resisting the advances of the older male guest. The west wall shows three figures either arriving late or exiting the symposium; an older man with a walking stick on the left, an undressed man with only a stole around his shoulders, and a woman playing a flute on the right. All three are adorned with wreathes. The east wall has a lone nude servant boy holding an oenochoe next to a serving table holding a krater and garland of olive leaves.

In the interior of the tomb, only a few objects were found: near the corpse (widely supposed to be a young man, despite the heavily deteriorated state of the skeleton) were a turtle shell, two arýballoi and an Attic lekythos. This last object, in black-figure technique from about 480 BCE, helped the discoverer and other scholars to date the tomb to about 470 BCE.

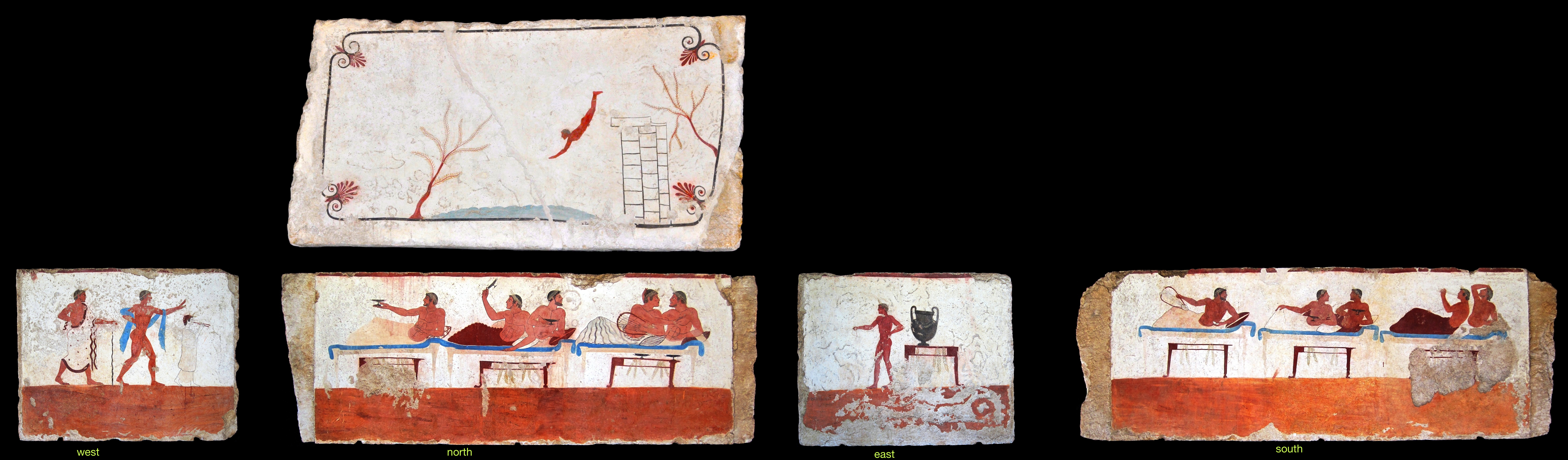

== Origin ==
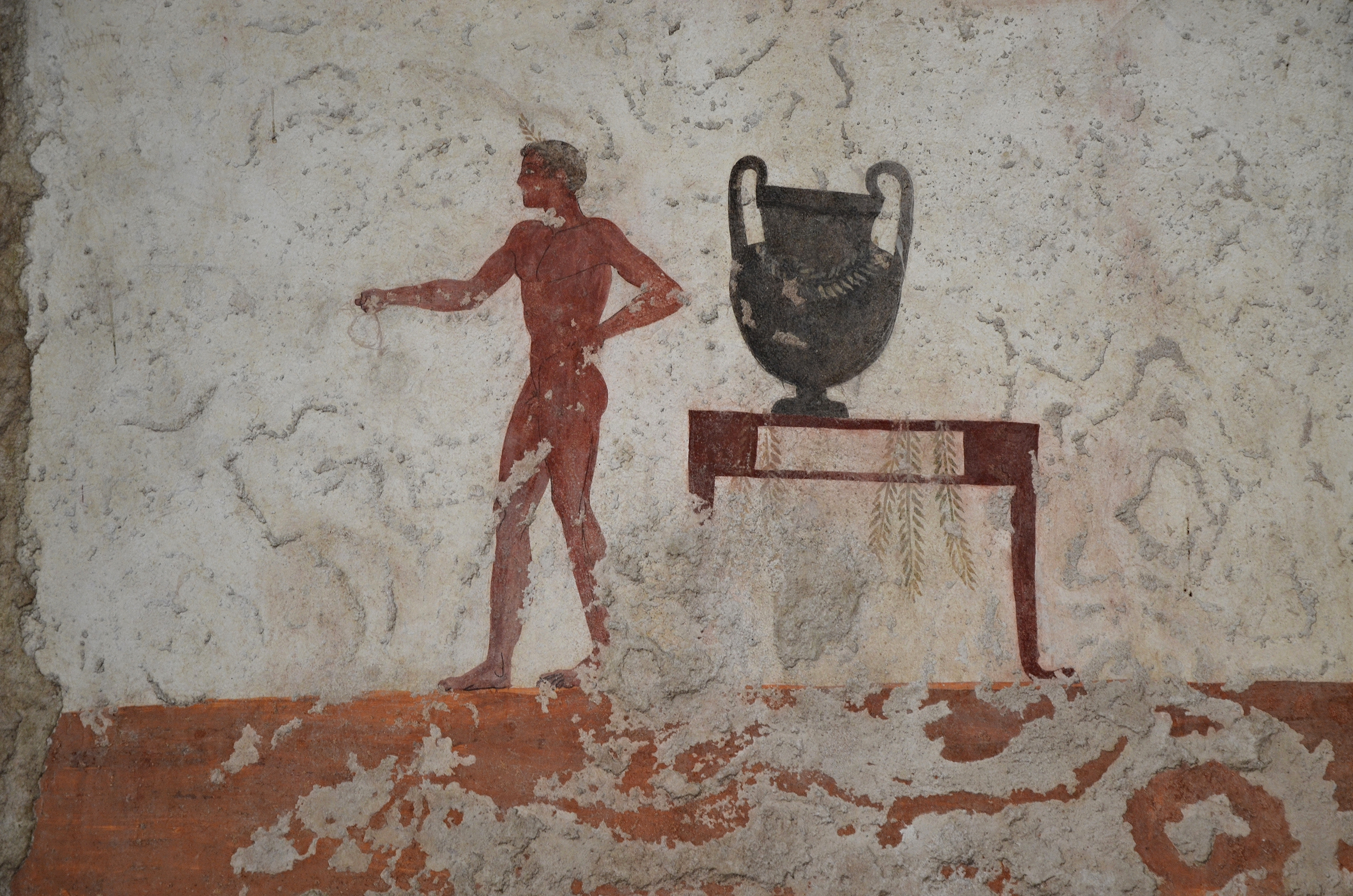
East Wall with Krater Kantharos

There is some debate about which civilization to attribute the building of this tomb, some say the deceased is Greek while others argue that he may be from an Italic tribe south of Paestum. Its frescoes are notable as they represent the only figured scenes dating to the Orientalizing, Archaic, or Classical periods to have survived in their entirety. While thousands of Greek tomes are known from the Archaic and Classical periods (roughly 700-400 BCE), this is the only tomb from that period to have been discovered decorated with frescoes of human subjects. This was presumably inspired by the many Etruscan painted tombs; Paestum was at the time a few kilometers from the border of the Greek and Etruscan zones of influence at the River Sele. Wall-paintings in other types of building were common in the Greek world, but survivals are extremely rare. Many scholars argue that this tomb is decidedly Greek due to the subject matter of symposium, which was not a social activity the Etruscans were known to engage in.

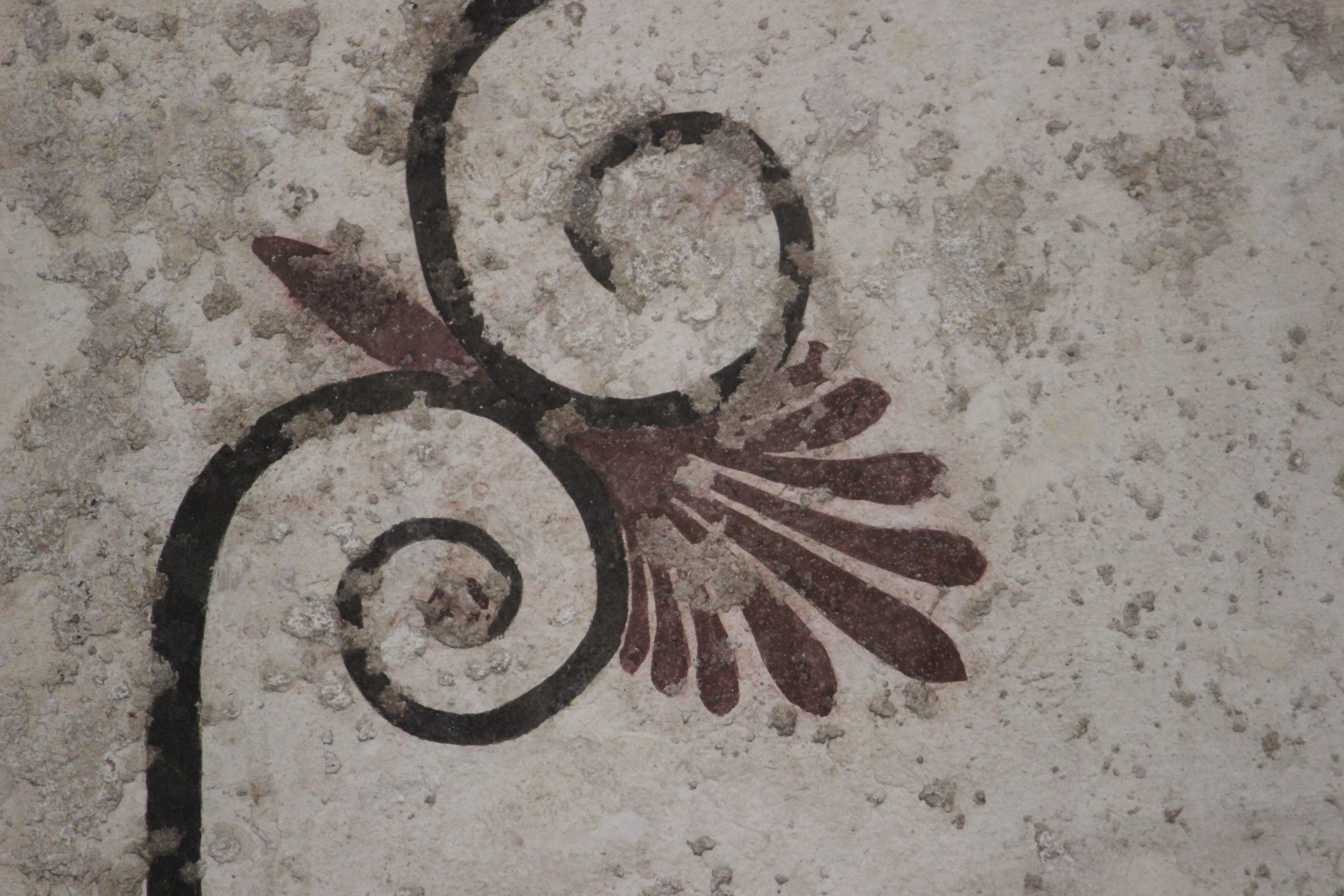
Palmette decoration from ceiling

Arguments have also been made that this tomb could have been made by an Italic tribe south of Paestum due to the style of vessel on the east wall. Some scholars have identified this as a volute krater. An identifying feature of volute kraters is the scroll like detail at the top of the handles, towards the mouth of the vessel, which is not present on the krater in the Tomb of the Diver. The eastern wall instead resembles a krater-kantharos, a style of vessel placed at the feet of a corpse in Italian tombs south of Poseidonia during the same period as the Tomb of the Diver. A krater-kantharos is quickly thrown and finished with a matte paint, loosely resembling a volute krater but with a wider body and less ornamental handles, and again was made for funerary purposes.

Other frescoed tombs from the fifth century BCE have similar stylistic adornments to the Tomb of the Diver, for example the Tomb of the Palmettes, found in Macedonia, is adorned with its namesake palmettes which can likewise be found on the four corners of the ceiling of the Tomb of the Diver. The presence of Egyptian blue pigment in the fresco tells us that the deceased was a wealthy individual because Egyptian blue was not a commonly available color for frescoes and was therefore expensive. Analyzing the pigments used in this tomb in comparison with Lucanian frescos predating it, as well as with other Greek frescos from the same period, has led to the conclusion that this tomb is the result of an artisanal style of painting local to Paestum.

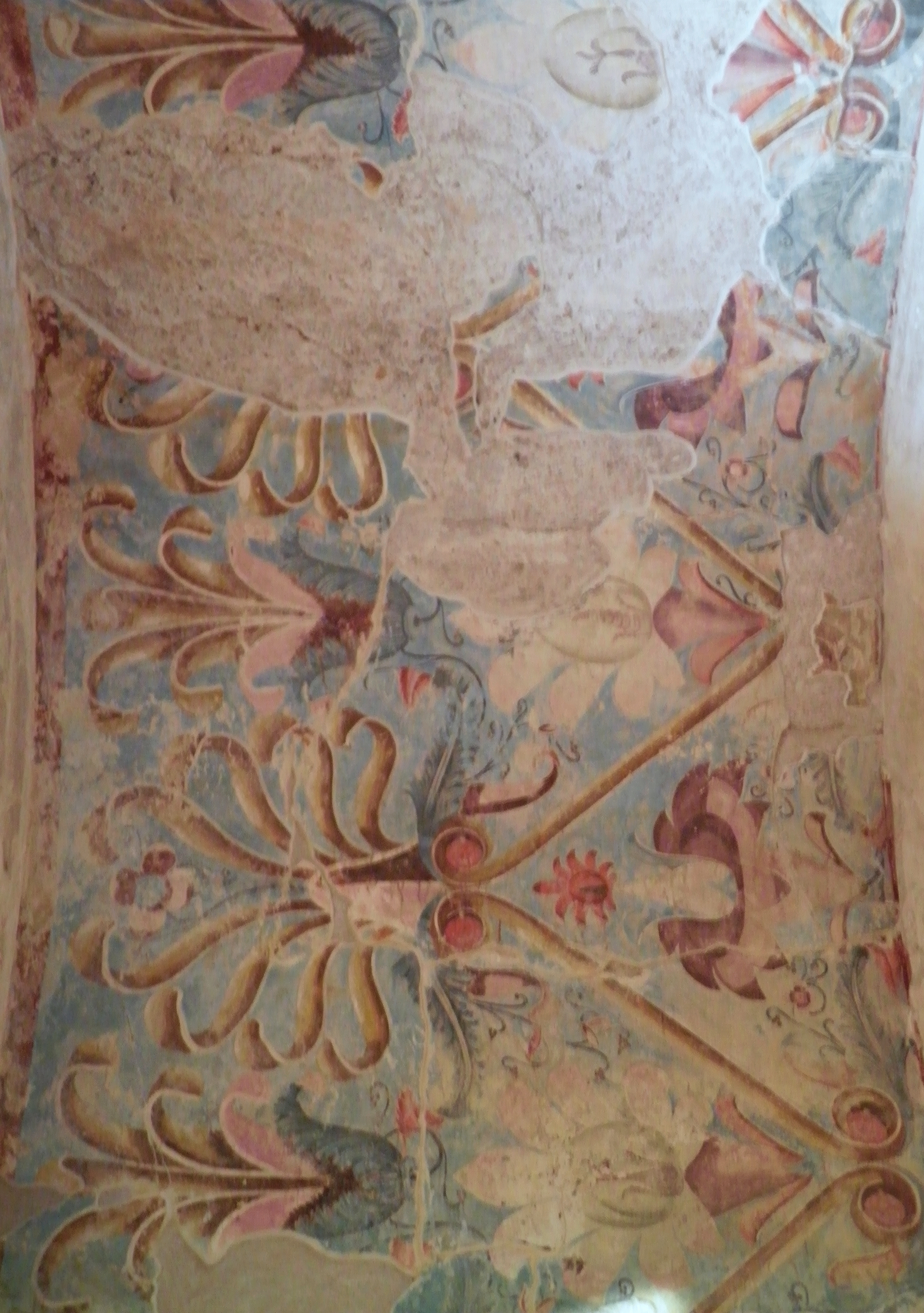
Tomb of the Palmettes

== Symbolism ==
=== Symposium Scenes ===
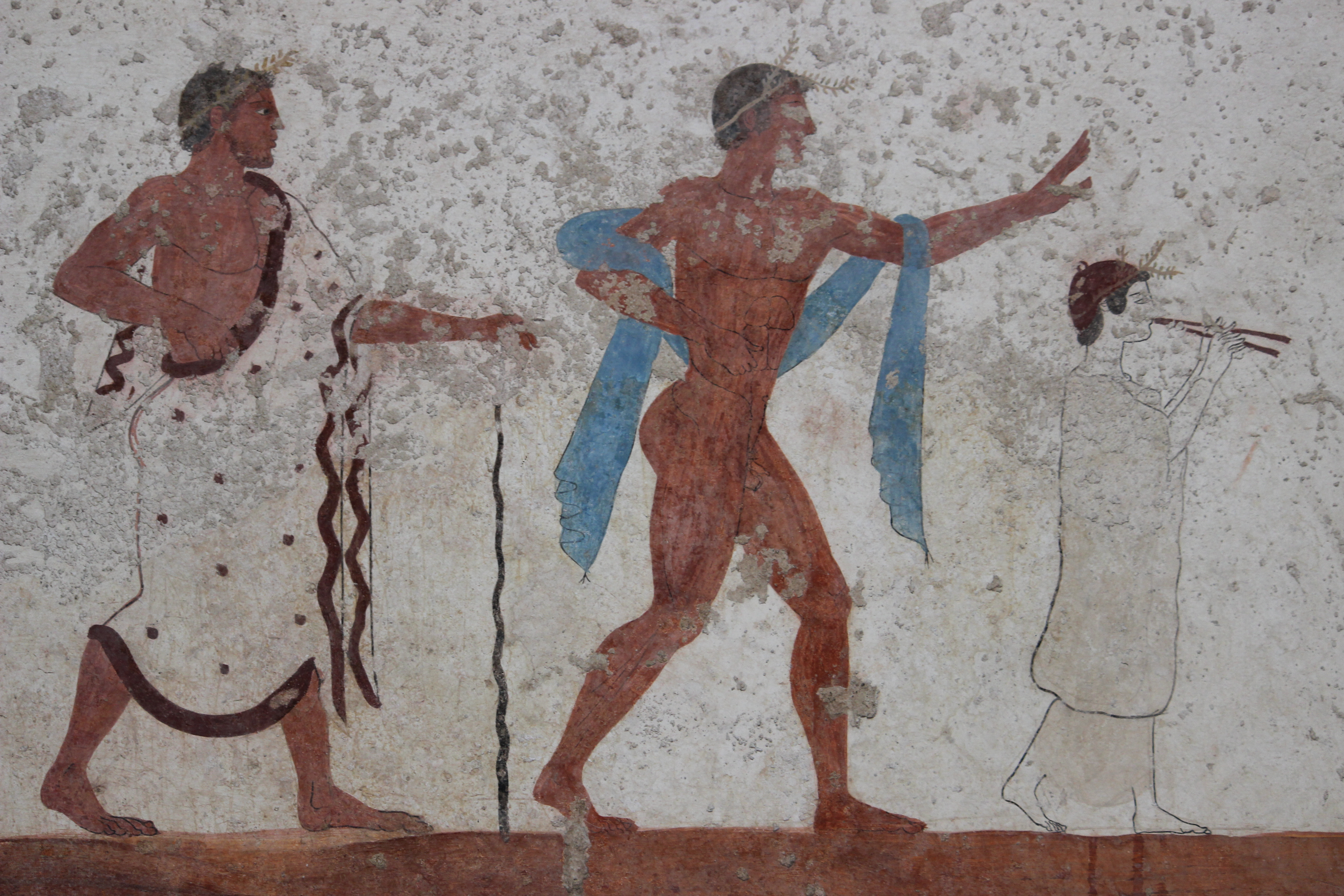
Figures on the West Wall

It is considered odd by many scholars that the Tomb of the Diver hosts scenery of Greek symposium, mainly because it is not a traditional funerary subject. There is a theory that the central nude figure on the west wall is in fact a representation of the deceased, and his lack of dress in the scene may be interpreted as an example of formal undress which is seen with Greek gods and heroic deaths. Formal undress is a tool used in pottery and sculpture of this time to communicate an elevated state. Combined with the drinking of Dionysus' wine, the nudity of the figures may be interpreted as a sort of symbolism for this higher consciousness. If the members of the party on the west wall are just arriving, it can be interpreted that the remaining two seats on the lounges are open for the older man and the central nude and that the girl with the flute is another entertainer for these men. If the west wall shows these figures departing the party however, it is thought that perhaps this is a celebratory send off for that central figure.

The men reclining on the northern and southern walls display acts of pederasty, the socially accepted romantic relationship between an older man and a younger boy in ancient Greek culture. A symposium was a common location for these types of relationships to develop because they were a private space for elite Greek men to escape the realities of their daily lives. Sex and alcohol went hand in hand in these spaces. The depictions of symposia are prolific in ancient Greek art, but it was most commonly seen on pottery intended to be used at the symposium itself. These ceramic cups and bowls were made in humor, covered in scenes of animalistic desire and of hungover men sick the next morning. The fact that this tomb bears frescos of such an informal subject is an anomaly.

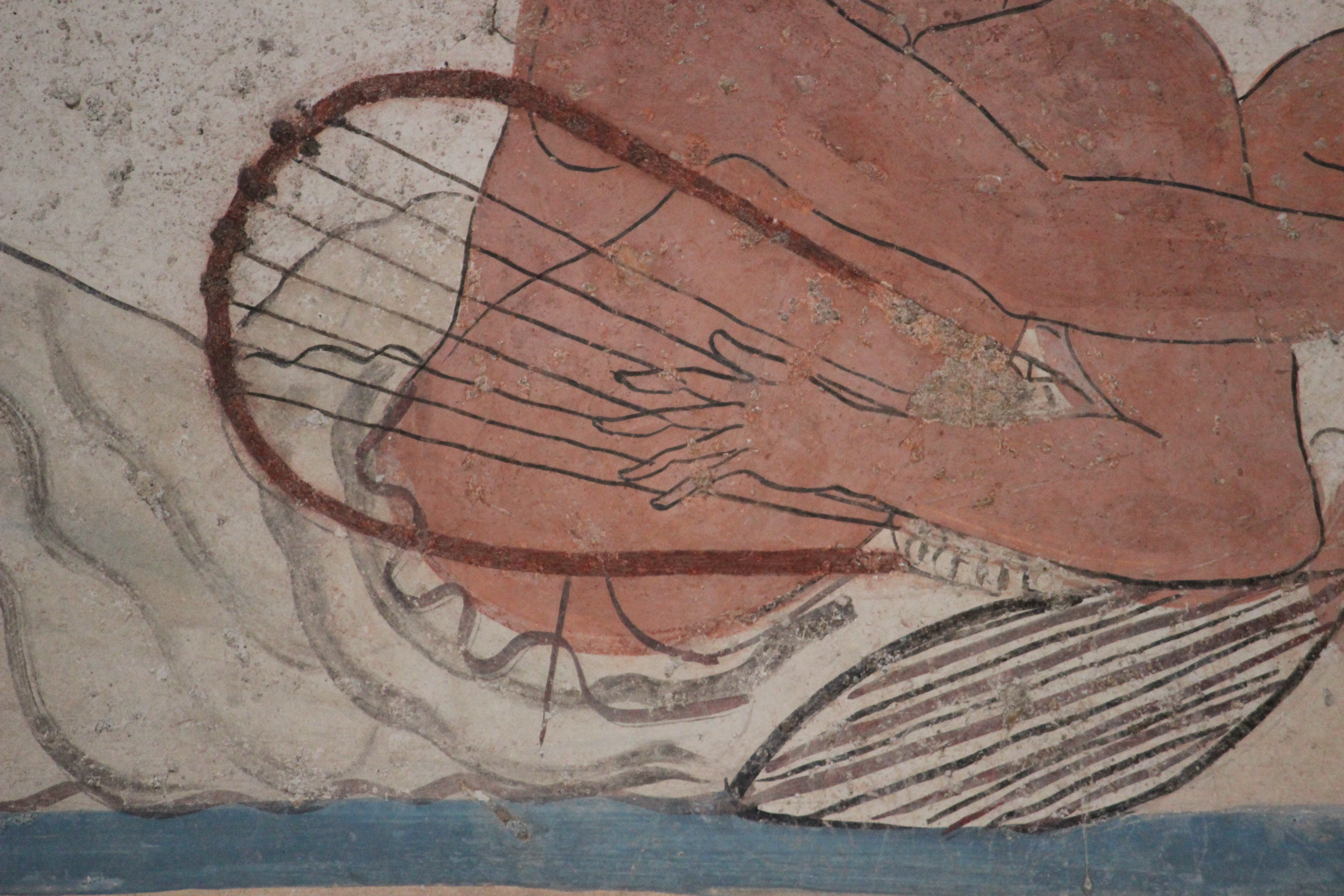
Close up of one of the stringed instruments depicted in the symposium scene of the tomb.

Two types of musical instruments, such as what appears to be a Greek flute (aulos) and two stringed musical instruments, are also depicted in the symposium scene surrounding the four walls of the tomb. This combination of the two instruments together represented on the tomb's frescoes has been interpreted in a few ways. One potential interpretation is that the inclusion of the instruments functions as a way to connect the imagery of paradise and happiness that is often associated with the typical symposium scene with the hope for happiness and celebration in the afterlife. Stringed musical instruments in particular have long been associated with the salvation of the soul in the afterlife in Greek religion. The inclusion of musical instruments has also been interpreted as another way to symbolize the status of the deceased buried in the tomb, as Greek culture had valued musical training as part of the academic curriculum of the refined, educated man. Additionally, there have been other tombs excavated in the Paestum region where remnants of musical instruments similar to the ones depicted in the symposium scene were found along with the deceased, including two tortoise shells (potentially used as lyre resonators) and an aulos. The archaeological evidence of these instruments in other tombs in the area have been interpreted as an indication that there is an importance associated with these instruments, either in a societal context more broadly or funerary contexts, that go beyond their potential importance here in the Tomb of the Diver.

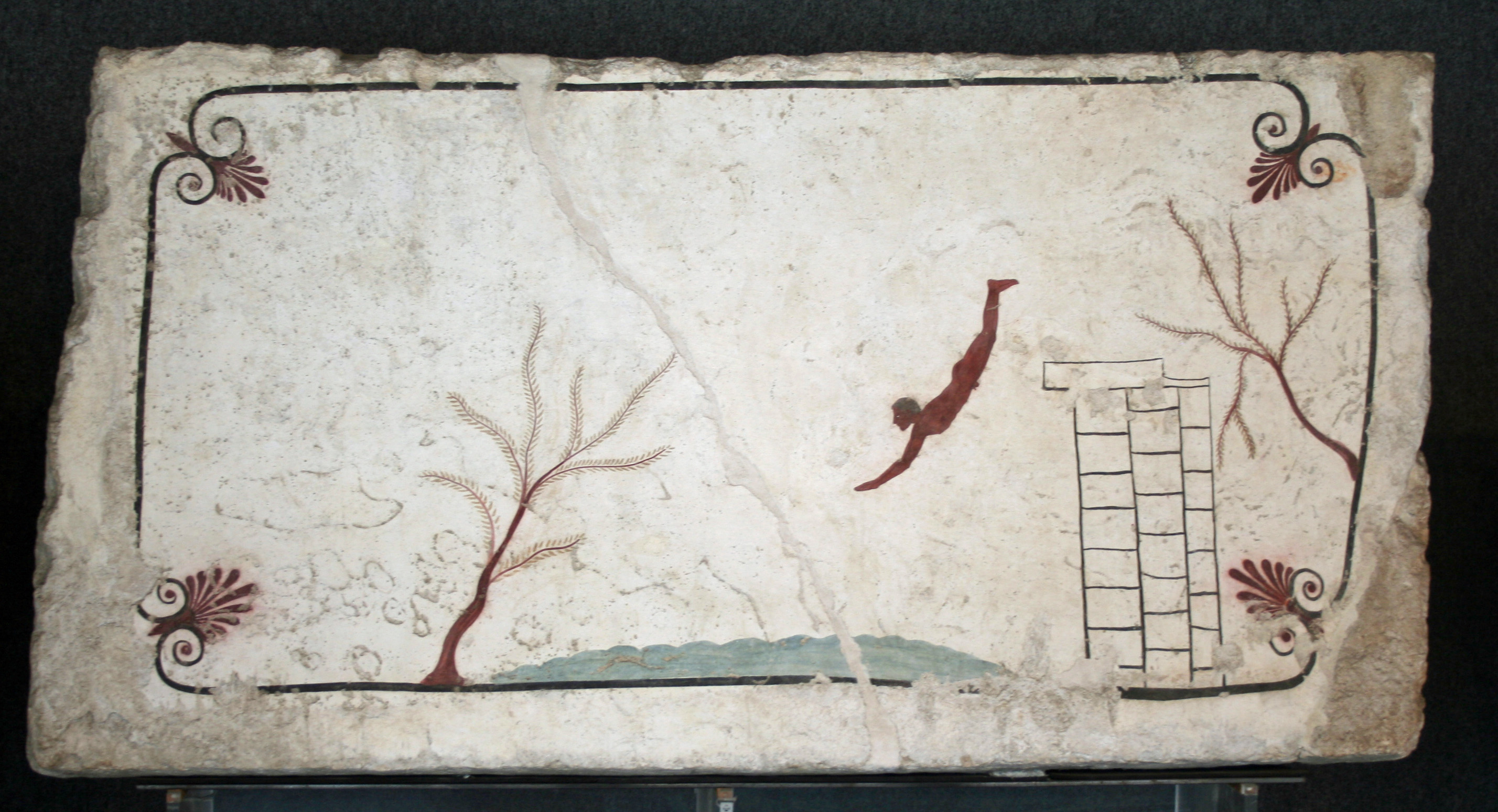
Ceiling

=== The Diver ===
The diver himself has also puzzled historians with his connection to the symposium. Some scholars note that the direction of the diver's leap would land him in the raised cup of the symposiasts playing kottabos on the northern wall, whose tossed wine would then land in the cup of the man in front of him, but this path only truly comes to life when the ceiling imagined vertically above the northern wall like an extension of the scene. The concept of diving itself is not new to Ancient Greek death, and is often utilized in archaic poetry in scenes of passionate loss such as the death of a loved one. In that regard, this scene may be the only one with a clear connection to death in the tomb. It would be a symbolic scene evoking the passage to the otherworld. The diver leaping into the water (or ocean) may be a representation of the theme of leaping into the unknown, while the structure from which he launches himself may symbolise the limit of the known world. According to Pierre Lévêque, the "diver plunges into the sea (death), but also into life (eternity), where he will rediscover the primordial waters of life". A similar diving figure can be found in a fresco from the Tomb of Hunting and Fishing in the Necropolis of Monterozzi.

Other scholars have also given more literal explanations for the diver's significance on the roof of the tomb, such as the diver representing an acrobat at a diving event (a petauristarius). Some evidence proffered for this interpretation is that the structure represented in the fresco may be a type of ladder a diver would have used rather than a stone tower, and that the positioning of the trees depicts a vantage point looking upwards, such as how one would look up to watch a diving event. Additionally, some scholars point to literary texts, such as Petronius' Satyricon, as examples showing similar athletic performances at dinner parties. There may also be evidence for some Paestum houses having swimming pools, giving a possible venue for the diving to have taken place. However, this interpretation of the diver of the roof of the tomb has received pushback. Holloway, in response to this interpretation, noted that Petronius' novel was written around 500 years after the tomb was created and does not reference Greek symposia. Other texts that also speak of divers at symposia may also be metaphors rather than literal depictions of the event, such as diving potentially being used as a metaphor for eating a meal enthusiastically in Plato's Laches.

== Attribution ==
Two masters have been distinguished, with the south wall being painted by a less skilled artist than the other. The work of the Maestro del Tuffatore copies the style of red attic painting in the way the figures are outlined. This is best seen in the symposium scenes, where the reclining figures' anatomy is well described and their likeness is highly individualistic. The Maestro del Tuttafore also has overlapping and foreshortening in his composition, creating a complex yet believable scene of figures reclining amongst one another. The only wall which does not seem to follow this style is the eastern wall, with the lone servant boy whose form is only defined by a minimal contour, which scholars have attributed to the Maestro della Lastra Sud. This wall does include its own details of mastery, such as the distinctive outline of the oenochoe implying a silver material in comparison to the solid form of the krater, which is known to be ceramic. The Maestro della Lastra Sud is still considered the inferior artist, however, due to the lack of complexity in his composition and the minimal detail in the wall overall. These artists likely acquired income from other sources of work outside of tomb frescoes, such as local temples, which were often made of similar materials of limestone and plaster as well as decorated in a similar fashion.

== See also ==
- Etruscan art
- Pederasty
- Pederasty in Ancient Greece
- Tomb of the Augurs
- Tomb of the Bulls
- Tomb of the Dancers
- Tomb of Hunting and Fishing
- Tomb of the Leopards
- Tomb of the Triclinium
