= Elia Visconti =

Italian footballer (born 2000)

Personal information
- Date of birth: 30 June 2000 (age 26)
- Place of birth: Bettola, Italy
- Height: 1.75 m (5 ft 9 in)
- Position: Defender

Team information
- Current team: Cavese
- Number: 90

Youth career
- –2018: Inter Milan
- 2018–2020: Bologna

Senior career*
Years	Team	Apps	(Gls)
2020–2021	Bologna	0	(0)
2020–2021	→ Piacenza (loan)	31	(0)
2021–2025	Lucchese	126	(5)
2025–2026	San Marino	18	(2)
2026–	Cavese	16	(0)

International career
2016	Italy U16	7	(0)
2016–2017	Italy U17	18	(1)
2017–2018	Italy U18	2	(0)
- * Club domestic league appearances and goals as of 1 May 2026

Elia Visconti (born 30 June 2000) is an Italian professional footballer who plays as a defender for Serie C Group C club Cavese.

== Club career ==
On 13 August 2021, he signed a two-year contract with Lucchese.

== International career ==
He represented Italy at the 2017 UEFA European Under-17 Championship, where they did not advance from the group stage.
