= Paestum (frazione) =

- Frazione
- Location of Paestum in Italy
- Coordinates: 40°24′21″N 15°0′7″E
- Country: Italy
- Region: Campania
- Province: Salerno (SA)
- Comune: Capaccio Paestum

Population
  - Total: 981
- Demonym: Pestani / Poseidonati / Posidonici
- Time zone: UTC+1 (CET)
  - Summer (DST): UTC+2 (CEST)
- Postal code: 84047
- Dialing code: (+39) 0828

Paestum (Italian: [ˈpɛstum]) is a frazione of the comune (municipality) of Capaccio Paestum in the Cilento area of southern Italy. It lies in the province of Salerno which is part of the region of Campania. It is situated on the Tyrrhenian coast and is notable for the famous ruins of the ancient city of the same name nearby.

== Overview ==
Paestum can be reached by the road linking Agropoli to Battipaglia. Paestum railway station is on the Naples-Salerno-Reggio Calabria railway line. The nearest airport is Salerno-Pontecagnano (QSR), 30 km from Paestum.
