= Laura, Capaccio =

Laura
- Frazione
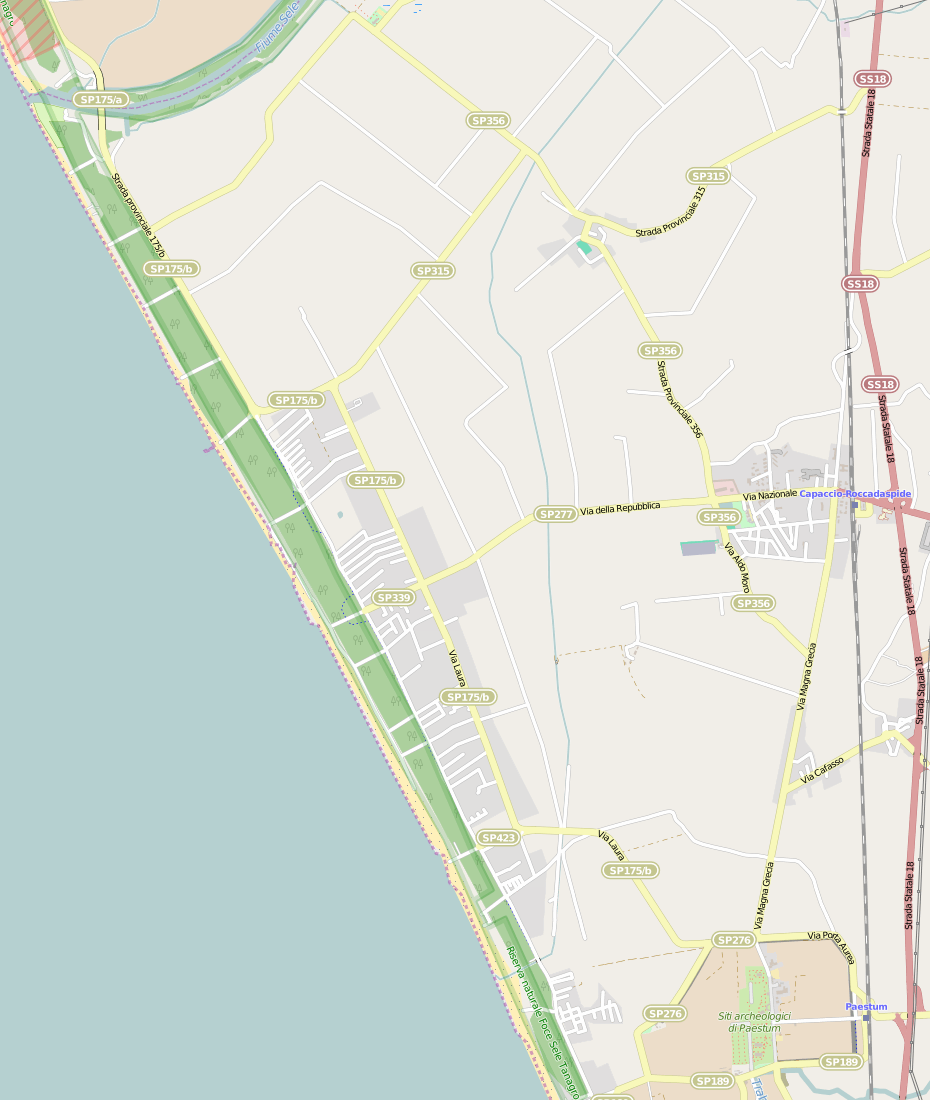
- OSM map of Laura including part of Paestum, Capaccio Scalo, Gromola, Cafasso and the Sele river mouth

- Location of Laura in Italy
- Coordinates: 40°27′0.13″N 14°58′35.5″E
- Country: Italy
- Region: Campania
- Province: Salerno (SA)
- Comune: Capaccio
- Elevation: 6 m (20 ft)

Population (2001)
  - Total: 1,301
- Demonym: Laurensi
- Time zone: UTC+1 (CET)
  - Summer (DST): UTC+2 (CEST)
- Postal code: 84063
- Dialing code: (+39) 0828
- Patron saint: St. Mary Lauretana

Laura is a southern Italian village and hamlet (frazione) of Capaccio, a municipality in the province of Salerno, Campania. As of 2001 its population was of 1,301.

== History ==
On September 9, 1943, the beaches of Laura and Paestum were the landing points of the U.S. Fifth Army during the Operation Avalanche, part of the Allied invasion of Italy.

== Geography ==
Located in the northern side of Cilentan Coast, nearby the mouth of Sele river, Laura lies a few km from the Ancient Greek city of Paestum and the village of Capaccio Scalo. It is 12 km far from Capaccio, 14 from Agropoli, 25 from Eboli, 22 from Battipaglia and 36 from Salerno.

The inhabited area extends along the main road and by the Tyrrhenian coastline, that is part of the Nature Reserve Foce Sele-Tanagro. The urban expansion, as well as to the surrounding villages, began in the late 20th century, because of the seaside tourism and the proximity to the ruins of Paestum.

== Transport ==
Crossed in the middle by the provincial highway SP 175/B that links Salerno to Agropoli by the coast, Laura is few km far from the national highway SS 18 Naples-Reggio Calabria and from the railway stations of Capaccio-Roccadaspide and Paestum.

== See also ==
- Cilentan dialect
- Cilento and Vallo di Diano National Park
