= National Archaeological Museum of Paestum =

Archaeological museum in Capaccio Paestum, Italy

Coordinates: 40.4234°N 15.0075°E

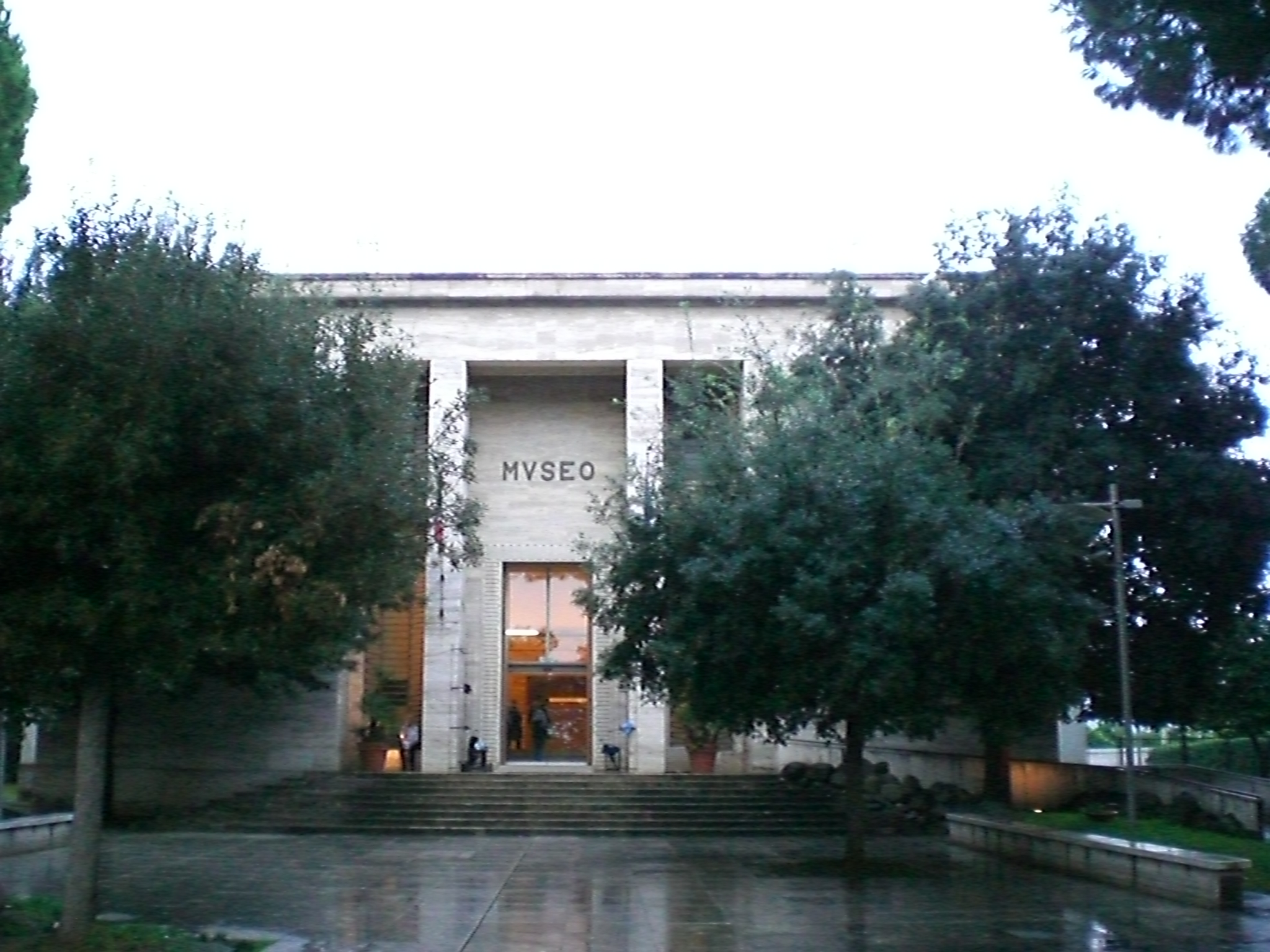
National Archaeological Museum of Paestum

The National Archaeological Museum of Paestum (Italian: Museo Archeologico Nazionale di Paestum) is a museum in Capaccio-Paestum, Salerno, southern Italy that houses archaeological finds from excavations of the ancient Greek city of Poseidonia/Paistom, then Paestum. The museum is one of the major "on-site" museums in Italy. It is composed of different sections that allow the visitor to retrace the ancient history of the city.

The museum houses numerous archaeological finds originating from the sacred city of Paestum, the Heraion at Foce del Sele, and nearby necropoleis, including the Gaudo necropolis and the Santa Venera necropolis.

Since 2015, following the Prime Ministerial Decree 171/2014, the museum became a state museum with special autonomy. In 2017, the Paestum excavations and museum were the fifteenth most visited Italian state site, with 441,037 visitors.

== The collection ==
The museum holds a diverse collection of artifacts from the sanctuary sites of Paestum. Among them are inscriptions that provide evidence of cults associated with healing. Votive terracotta figurines are also on display, depicting various deities, including Athena and a seated goddess believed to be Hera. The votive offerings, including figurines and potsherds, preserved in the museum provide decisive evidence, through the iconography of the goddess, for tracking the origins of the cult of Hera of Poseidonia within the Achaean tradition of Southern Italy, which in turn had its roots in the cult of Hera practiced in more ancient times by the Achaean populations of the Eastern Plain of Argolis.

The museum also houses painted vases, such as a locally produced lekythos depicting a scene from the Adonia festival, which commemorated the death of Adonis. During its early days, Paestum imported pottery from Attica. However, by the 4th century BC, the city had its own thriving pottery workshops. The museum showcases numerous exquisite examples of red-figured Paestan ware, primarily from burial sites. These artifacts are exhibited in a gallery that offers a view of the surrounding farmland, stretching towards the Campanian mountains. The farmland is still enclosed by ancient defensive walls, adding to the historical ambiance of the museum's setting.

The National Archaeological Museum of Paestum also preserves about five hundred painted slabs and fragments of slabs, mainly from tombs of the Lucan period (5th – 3rd century BC), recovered from necropolises during the first decades of the 20th century. The restoration/maintenance of many slabs of the Lucanian funerary art has been a unique opportunity to carry out a multi-disciplinary and multi-analytical study of these pre-Roman wall paintings.

The storage of the Archaeological Park of Paestum hosts several thousands of illegally excavated artefacts, mostly grave goods from the rich necropolises outside the ancient walls. These artefacts are also useful for investigating stolen archaeological finds.

The Museum also contains an autism-friendly program.

== The exhibition ==
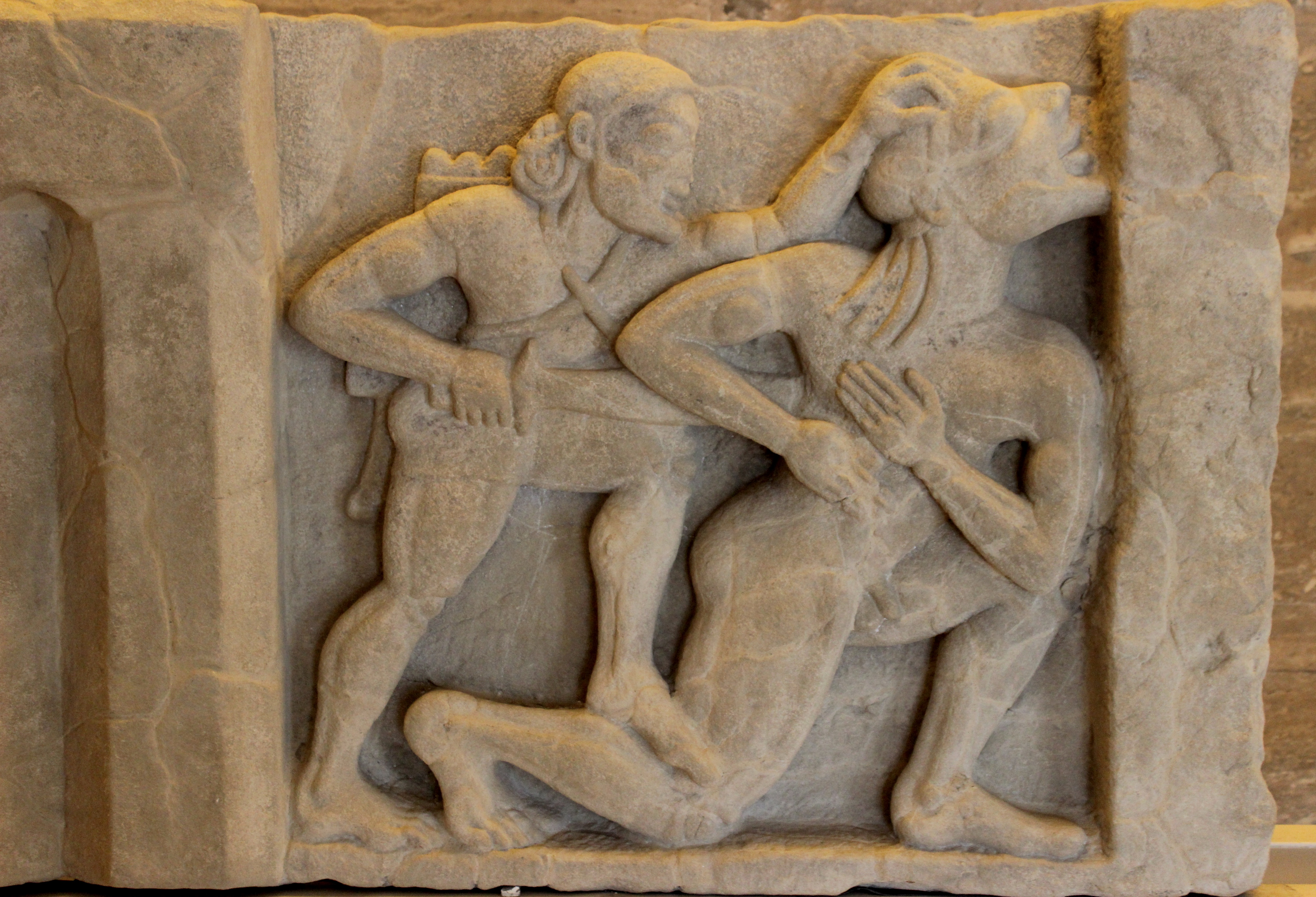
Metope from the Temple of Hera at the mouth of the Sele River. Hercules slays the giant Alcyoneus.

The exhibition unfolds over three floors divided into seven sections:

- The prehistoric section
- The origin of Paestum
- The Heraion at Foce del Sele
- Urban sanctuaries
- The necropolis of Poseidonia-Paestum
- The Lucanian painted tombs
- The Roman room

Among the exhibits the following stand out:

- The archaic metopes of the Heraion del Sele
- The Tomb of the Diver
- The stelae in Oscan language
- The chamber tomb of Spinazzo

== Research ==
A wider research line is aimed at deepening the understanding of cultural interactions and technological influences between Greek colonies and Italic pre-Roman societies. The museum has provided the fragments analyzed in some studies. The direction of the Museum promoted research activities on scientific methodologies for the study of archaeological finds in collaboration with the Associazione Italiana di Archeometria.

Instruments preserved at the Museum, like aulos, are reconstructed in 3D model

The Museum has hosted a survey using conjoint choice approach questions to elicit people's preferences for cultural heritage management strategies for an outstanding world heritage site.
