= Capaccio Paestum =

- Comune
- Comune di Capaccio Paestum
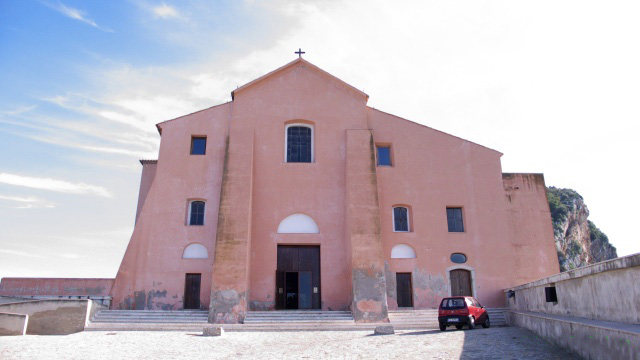
- The Sanctuary of St. Mary of Granato

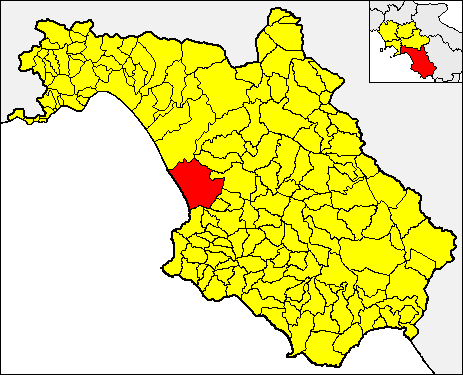
- Capaccio Paestum within the Province of Salerno

- Location within Italy Location within Campania
- Coordinates: 40°25′N 15°5′E
- Country: Italy
- Region: Campania
- Province: Salerno (SA)
- Frazioni: Borgo Nuovo, Cafasso, Capaccio Scalo, Chiorbo, Foce Sele, Gaiarda, Gromola, Laura, Licinella, Linora, Paestum, Ponte Barizzo, Rettifilo-Vannulo, Spinazzo, Santa Venere, Tempa di Lepre, Torre di Mare, Tempa San Paolo, Vuccolo Maiorano

Government
  - Mayor: Gaetano Paolino (Civic lists of centre-left)

Area
  - Total: 113.03 km^{2} (43.64 sq mi)
- Elevation: 441 m (1,447 ft)

Population (31 December 2017)
  - Total: 22,802
  - Density: 201.73/km^{2} (522.49/sq mi)
- Demonym: Capaccesi
- Time zone: UTC+1 (CET)
  - Summer (DST): UTC+2 (CEST)
- Postal code: 84047 (Capoluogo), 84040 (Capaccio Scalo), 84050 (Laura-Gromola), 84063 ( Paestum), 84060 (Ponte Barizzo)
- Dialing code: 0828
- ISTAT code: 065025
- Patron saint: St. Vitus
- Saint day: 15 June
- Website: Official website

Capaccio Paestum (formerly only Capaccio, from Latin Caput Aquae) is a town and comune in the province of Salerno in the Campania region of south-western Italy. The ruins of the ancient Greek city of Paestum lie within borders of the comune.

== Geography ==
Located in northern Cilento, near the mouth of Sele, Capaccio is a hill town surrounded by a plain in which reside almost all of the hamlets (frazioni) and the majority of the population, mostly concentrated at Capaccio Scalo, seat of the train station.

The municipality borders with Agropoli, Albanella, Cicerale, Eboli, Giungano, Roccadaspide and Trentinara.

The comune of Capaccio Paestum includes the hamlets of Borgo Nuovo, Capaccio Scalo, Cafasso, Chiorbo, Foce Sele, Gaiarda, Gromola, Laura, Licinella, Linora, Paestum, Ponte Barizzo, Rettifilo-Vannulo, Spinazzo, Santa Venere, Tempa di Lepre, Torre di Mare, Tempa San Paolo, and Vuccolo Maiorano.

== Transport ==
The nearest airport is Salerno-Pontecagnano (QSR), 35 km from Capaccio.

== Notable people ==
- Vincenzo Romano
- Michele Siano
- Bettina Köster

== See also ==
- Cilentan Coast
- Cilento
