= Museum Street (York) =

Street in York, England

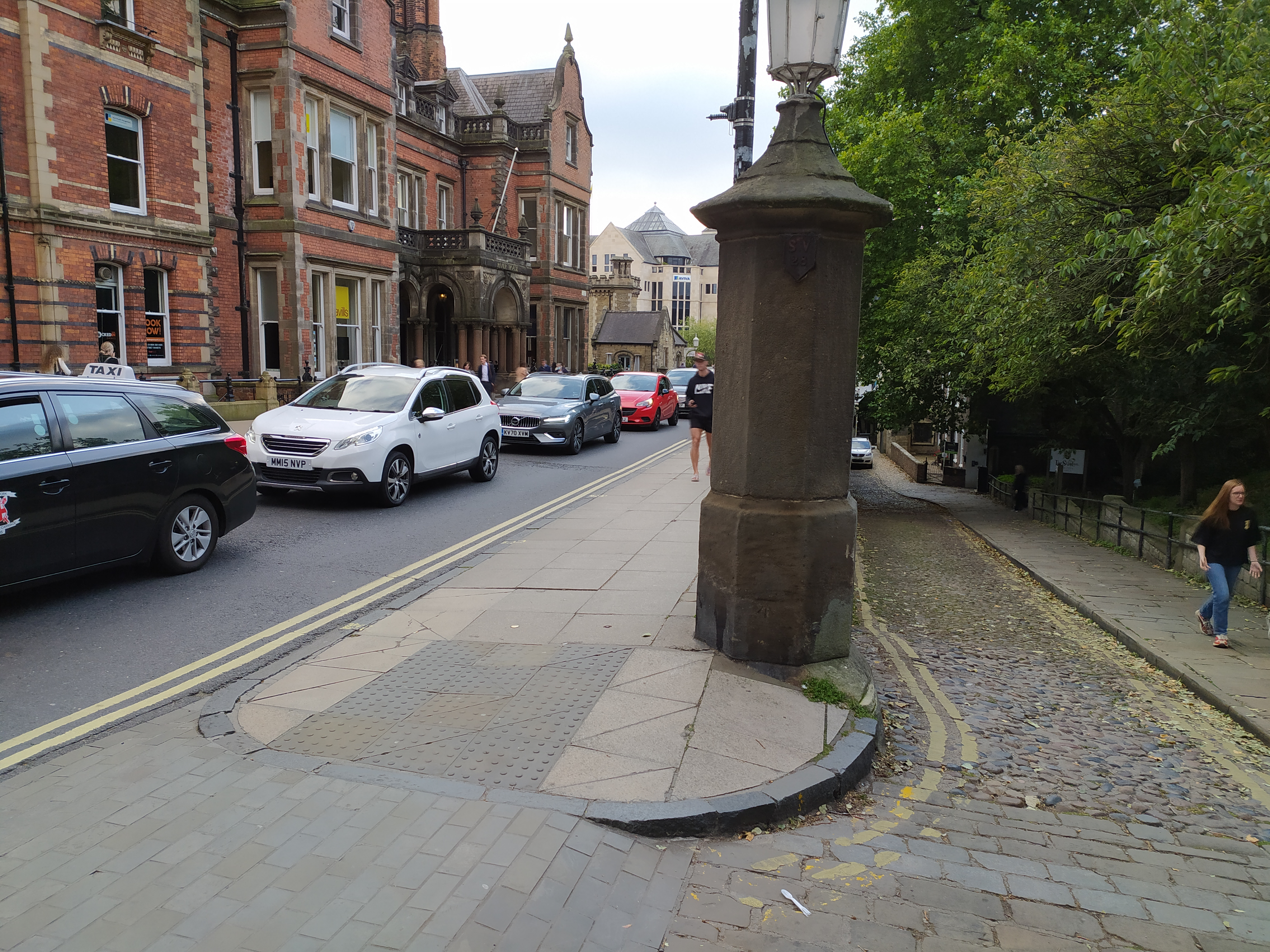
- The western end of Museum Street, showing Lendal Bridge and the route down to St Leonard's Landing
- Location within York
- Former names: Footloose Lane; Back Lendal
- Location: York, England
- Coordinates: 53.9609°N 1.0860°W
- North east end: Blake Street; Duncombe Place; St Leonard's Place
- Major junctions: Lendal
- South west end: Lendal Bridge; Dame Judi Dench Walk

Museum Street is a road in the city centre of York, in England.

== History ==
The area covered by the street lay partly within the walls of Roman Eboracum, and entirely within the current Mediaeval York city walls. It emerged as a narrow lane running immediately south-east of the boundary wall of St Leonard's Hospital. It was first recorded in the 1260s as Ffotlesgayle, or "Footloose Lane", possibly referring to people resident at the hospital who were unable to walk easily. The section north-east of Lendal later became known as "Finkle Street", a name which has since been reused for a different street in the city centre. By the 18th-century, the entire length of the street was known as Back Lendal. It became increasingly important, as St Leonard's Landing lay at its south-western end, from which the Lendal Ferry ran across the River Ouse.

In 1782, the street was widened, the wall of the hospital and part of the building being demolished, but the construction of a new terrace on the north-west side again restricted its width. In 1830, the Yorkshire Museum was opened to the north of the former hospital, and the grounds became the Museum Gardens, with the main access from Back Lendal. In 1846, it was widened with the demolition of the terrace erected in 1782, and around this time, the Museum Chambers concert hall was constructed. By 1852, the road had become known as "Museum Street". In 1863, the Lendal Ferry was replaced by a new Lendal Bridge, accessed by a gentle ramp from the street, although its old route down to St Leonard's Landing also survives.

== Architecture ==
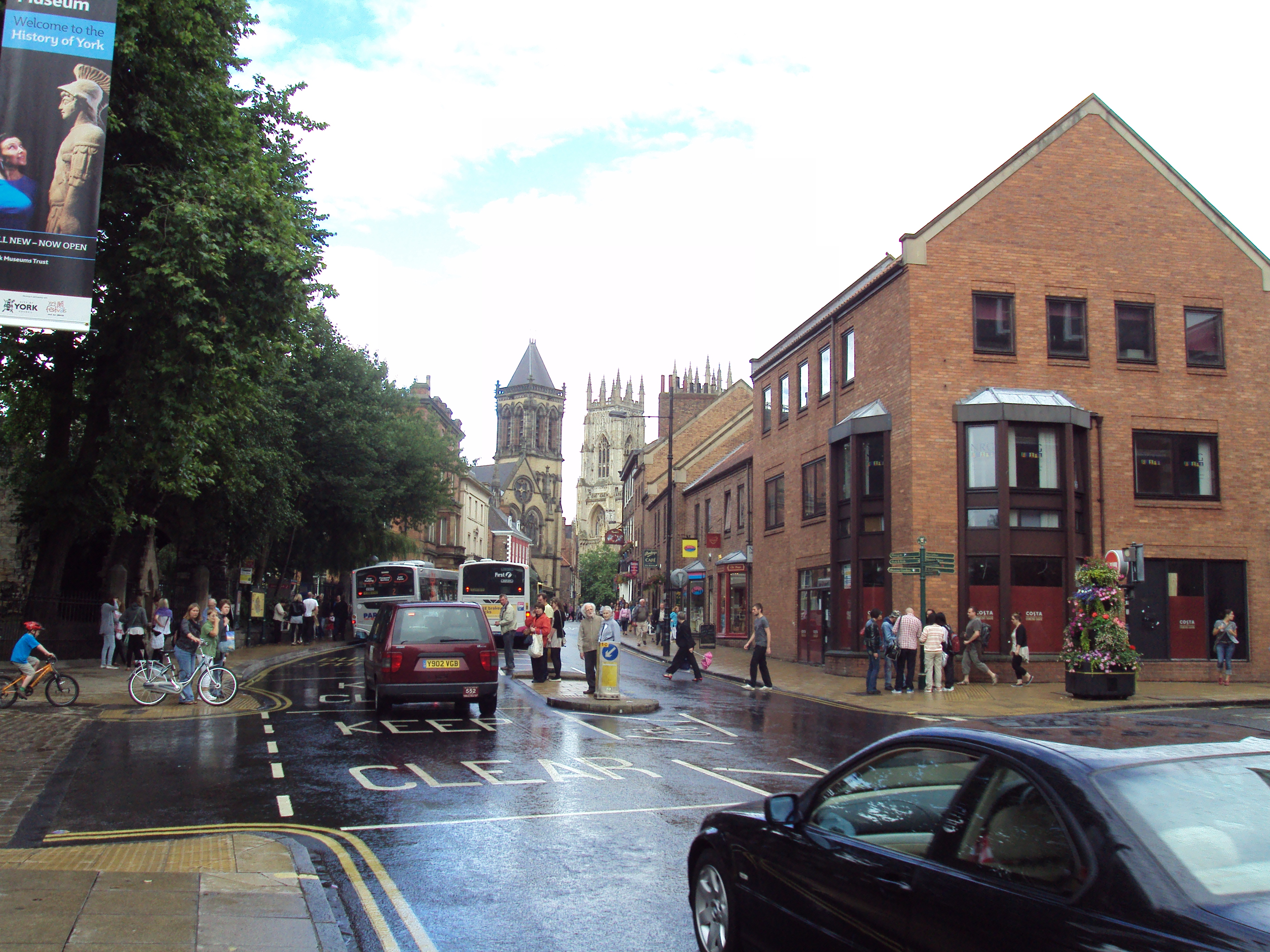
Looking east along the street, from Lendal

The street runs north-east, starting by the River Ouse at Lendal Bridge, or alternatively at St Leonard's Landing, where it meets Dame Judi Dench Walk. On its north-west side lie firstly Lendal Tower, the neighbouring 18th-century Lendal Hill House, and then a former engine house for the city's waterworks, built in 1836. These adjoin a short section of the York city walls, at the other end of which is a lodge building and the main entrance to the Museum Gardens. Next are the remains of St Leonard's Hospital, then Library Square, onto which the York Library faces, followed by 2-4 Museum Street, two listed buildings. The street ends at its junction with Blake Street, Duncombe Place and St Leonard's Place.

Notable buildings on the south-east side of the street include 1 Museum Street, built as the city's register office, now Topping & Company bookshop, and Museum Street Tavern, a pub built about 1700; and on the other side of Lendal, Club Chambers and River House, two large Victorian buildings near the river.
