= Hutton Hall, Huttons Ambo =

House in Huttons Ambo, North Yorkshire, England

Coordinates: 54°06′23″N 0°51′07″W

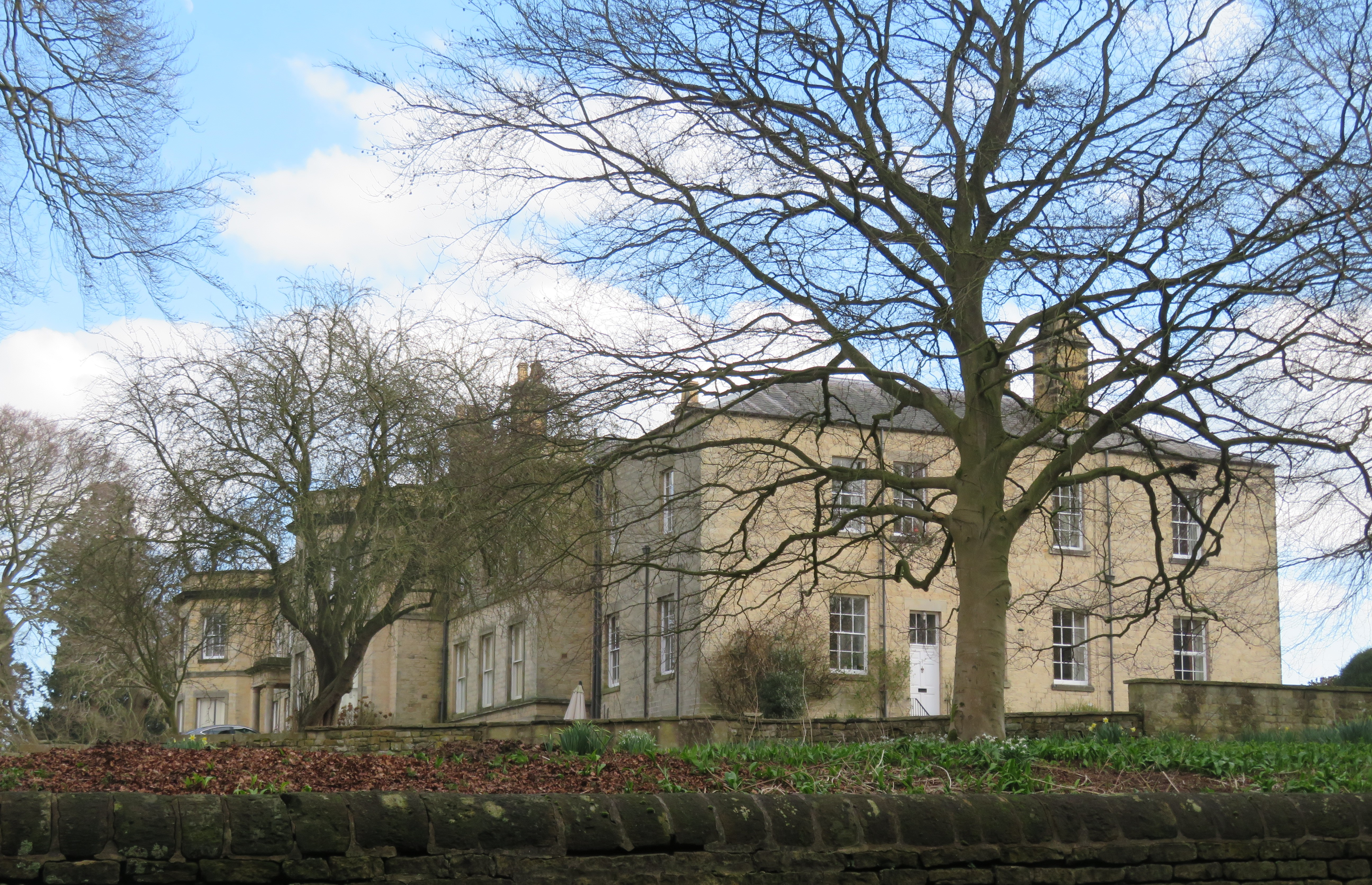
The building, in 2022

Hutton Hall is a historic building in Huttons Ambo, a parish in North Yorkshire, in England.

The hall was built in about 1820, on the site of an earlier building, at the west end of the hamlet of High Hutton. It was extended and altered later in the 19th century, and was remodelled in the 20th century. The building was grade II listed in 1986, by which time it had been converted into flats.

The building is constructed of sandstone on a plinth, with a sill band, a floor band, a moulded cornice, a coped parapet, and a slate roof. It has two storeys, a central block of five bays, flanking full-height projecting canted bay windows, and two wings on the right with two and three bays. On the front is a Doric portico with a metope frieze. The windows are sashes, the window above the portico with a round head and imposts, the others with flat heads, and all have keystones. Over the centre is an achievement between volutes.

== See also ==
- Listed buildings in Huttons Ambo
