= Listed buildings in Huttons Ambo =

Huttons Ambo is a civil parish in the county of North Yorkshire, England. It contains 18 listed buildings that are recorded in the National Heritage List for England. All the listed buildings are designated at Grade II, the lowest of the three grades, which is applied to "buildings of national importance and special interest". The parish contains the villages of High Hutton and Low Hutton and the surrounding countryside. Most of the listed buildings are houses, cottages, farmhouses and associated structures, and the others include a pinfold, a church and a milepost.

== Buildings ==
Name and location	Photograph	Date	Notes
Hutton Hall; 54.10645°N 0.85184°W		Mid 18th century	A house that was extended in the 19th century and later converted into flats, it is in sandstone on a plinth, with a sill band, a floor band, a moulded cornice, a coped parapet, and a slate roof. There are two storeys, a central block of five bays, flanking full-height projecting canted bay windows, and two wings on the right with two and three bays. On the front is a Doric portico with a metope frieze. The windows are sashes, the window above the portico with a round head and imposts, the others with flat heads, and all have keystones. Over the centre is an achievement between volutes.
Pinfold; 54.09945°N 0.83664°W		18th century (probable)	The pinfold is in sandstone. It consists of a square enclosure, with walls between 1.6 metres (5 ft 3 in) and 1.7 metres (5 ft 7 in) high.
Walker Cottage; 54.09849°N 0.83683°W	—	18th century	The house is in sandstone with a pantile roof. There are two storeys, two bays, and a continuous rear outshut under a catslide roof. The entrance is at the rear, and the windows are horizontally-sliding sashes with flat arches.
Rose Cottage; 54.09910°N 0.83570°W	—	Mid to late 18th century	The house is in sandstone with a stepped eaves course and a pantile roof. Thee are two storeys and two bays. On the front is a projecting porch, and the windows are sashes.
Beehive; 54.10647°N 0.84782°W		1773	An inn, later a private house, in sandstone, with a stepped eaves course, and a pantile roof with coped gables and shaped kneelers. There are two storeys, three bays, and a rear outshut. The central doorway has an initialled and dated keystone. It is flanked by sash windows, above it is a horizontally-sliding sash, and the other windows are cross windows. All but the cross windows have lintels with keystones.
Firwood Cottages; 54.10966°N 0.85164°W	—	Late 18th century	A terrace of four, later three, cottages in sandstone, with a pantile roof, moulded kneelers and coped gables. There are two storeys and seven bays. On the front are six doorways, some with fanlights, and sash windows, some horizontally-sliding. All the openings have painted wedge lintels.
Home Farmhouse; 54.10630°N 0.84882°W	—	Late 18th century	The farmhouse is in sandstone on a plinth, and has a pantile roof with shaped kneelers and coped gables. There are two storeys and three bays, and an extension to the right with a single storey and attic, and two bays. The entrance is at the rear, and the windows are sashes, some horizontally-sliding.
Netherby Hall; 54.10168°N 0.83549°W	—	Late 18th century	The house is in sandstone, and has a pantile roof with shaped kneelers and coped gables. There are two storeys and three bays, and a single-bay extension to the right. The doorway is in the centre, there is an enlarged fire window, and the other windows are sashes.
Netherby House Farmhouse; 54.10073°N 0.83717°W	—	Early 19th century	The farmhouse, which incorporates material from a 17th-century building, is in sandstone on a plinth, with a stepped eaves course, and a pantile roof with shaped kneelers and coped gables. There are two storeys, three bays, and a single-story outbuilding on the left. The doorway is in the centre, the windows are sashes, and all the openings have wedge lintels.
Stable Cottage and outbuildings 54.10631°N 0.85059°W	—	Early 19th century	A stable range, later a cottage and outbuildings, in sandstone with a slate roof, shaped kneelers and coped gables. . There are two storeys and an L-shaped plan, with ranges of five and two bays. In the long range are two segmental carriage arches, and two doorways with divided fanlights. Most of the windows are pivoting, and on the short range is a weathervane.
The Hollies; 54.09783°N 0.83565°W	—	Early 19th century	The house, which incorporates material from a 17th-century house at the rear, is in sandstone with a hipped pantile roof. There are two storeys, three bays, and a rear wing. The central doorway has a plain surround, a fanlight and a pediment, and the windows are sashes with wedge lintels.
Derwent Bank; 54.09818°N 0.83684°W	—	Early to mid 19th century	The house is in sandstone with a floor band and a hipped slate roof. There are two storeys, five bays and a rear extension. The central doorway has a rusticated surround, a fanlight and a cornice. The windows are sashes, those in the ground floor with triple keystones.
Railway Cottage; 54.09999°N 0.83287°W	—	c. 1845	A railway station and house, designed by G. T. Andrews for the York and North Midland Railway Company, later combined into a house, in sandstone, both with overhanging eaves and slate roofs. The buildings are in sandstone with overhanging eaves and slate roofs. The station has one storey, two bays and flanking gabled wings. The house has two storeys and three bays. The windows in both parts are sashes, and on the front of the station is a clock.
Briar Cottage, Glebe Cottage, Laurel Cottage and Pheasant Cottage; 54.10636°N 0.84744°W	—	Mid 19th century	A terrace of four sandstone cottages, with quoins, overhanging eaves, and a hipped slate roof. There are two storeys and eight bays. On the front are four doorways with shallow ogee arches, The windows have fixed lights and flat brick arches, and above the ground floor windows are segmental relieving arches. All the openings have chamfered quoined surrounds.
Lodge, Hutton Hall; 54.10766°N 0.85398°W	—	Mid 19th century	The lodge is in sandstone on a chamfered plinth, with limestone dressings, quoins and a slate roof. There is a single storey and a front of two bays. The left bay is gabled with bargeboards and a finial, and contains a canted bay window with a pyramidal roof. The windows have quoined moulded surrounds, ogee arches and mullions.
The Rise; 54.10659°N 0.84809°W	—	Mid 19th century	A pair of cottages converted into a house, in sandstone, with quoins, overhanging eaves, and a hipped pantile roof. There are two storeys and four bays. On the front is a lean-to porch. The windows are casements with quoined and chamfered surrounds, those in the ground floor with segmental relieving arches, and some with ogee heads.
St Margaret's Church; 54.10686°N 0.84908°W		1856	The church is in limestone with a slate roof, and is in Early English style. It consists of a nave, a north aisle, a south porch, and a chancel with an organ chamber and a north vestry. At the west end is a gabled bellcote with two lights and a quatrefoil above.
Milepost; 54.10335°N 0.86763°W		Late 19th century	The milepost on the northwest side of the A64 road is in cast iron, and has a triangular plan and a sloping top. On each face is a pointing hand, on the left face is the distance to Malton, and on the right face to York.
