= 1 Museum Street =

Listed building in York, England

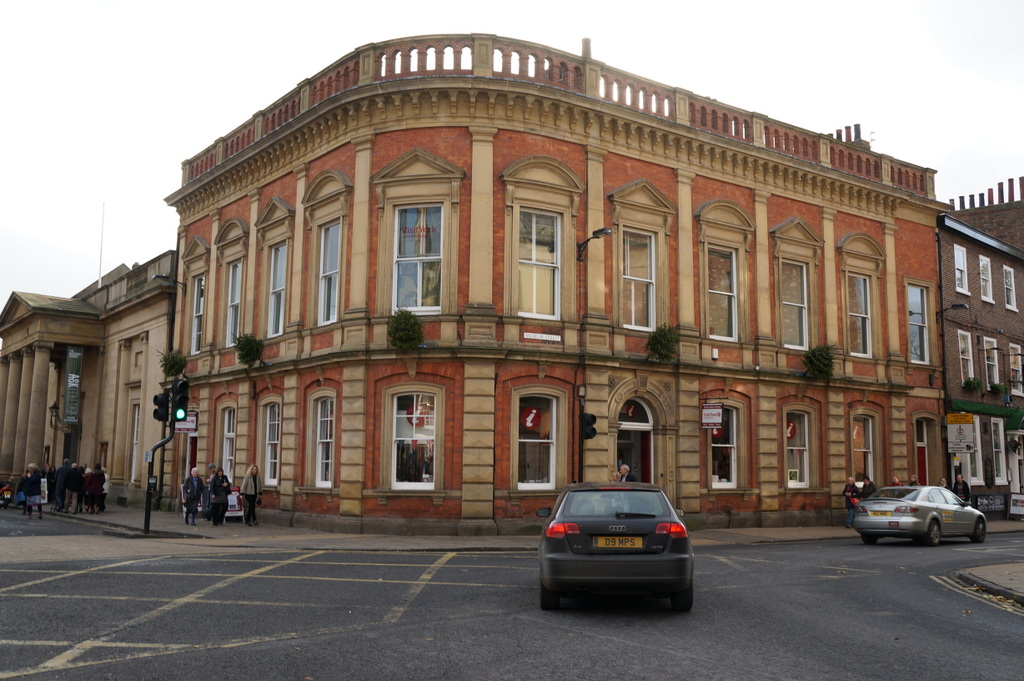
- The building in 2013
- Interactive map of the 1 Museum Street area

General information
- Status: Converted to retail use
- Type: Register office (former)
- Location: Museum Street, York, England
- Coordinates: 53°57′40″N 1°05′07″W
- Year built: 1860
- Owner: Topping & Company

Design and construction
- Architect: Rawlins Gould
- Designations

Listed Building – Grade II
- Official name: 1, Museum Street
- Designated: 8 October 1986
- Reference no.: 1257106

1 Museum Street is a historic building in the city centre of York, England.

The building was constructed in 1860 to a design by Rawlins Gould. It initially served as the city's register office. It later became a Conservative Club, with committee rooms, a bar and a snooker room and was subsequently used as council offices.

The building has two storeys and is built of orange brick with stone dressings. It has 11 bays, one of which curves around the corner from Museum Street into Blake Street. The main entrance is on Museum Street and has double doors with a fanlight above. Most of the sash windows have four panes, although some retain the original eight panes. The window pediments alternate between triangular and segmented forms. The upper floor has Doric pilasters. A brick balustrade was added to the roof in 1909.

Inside, a grand staircase leads up to the first-floor room, which contains a wooden tablet commemorating John Hodgson of Strensall. The room has housed meetings of the Board of Guardians of the York Poor Law Union.

The building was Grade II listed in 1986. In 2010 it was purchased by the York Conservation Trust, which renovated it for use as the city's tourist information centre. The office remained there until 2022. In June 2026, the bookseller Topping & Company opened a branch in the building.

== See also ==
- Listed buildings in York (within the city walls, northern part)
