= Hutton Hall =

Hutton Hall may refer to:

- Hutton Castle, also known as Hutton Hall, a castle in Berwickshire, Scotland
- Hutton Hall (Guisborough), a house near Guisborough, North Yorkshire, England
- Hutton Hall, Huttons Ambo, a house near Malton, North Yorkshire, England
- Hutton Hall, a building in Penrith, Cumbria, England
- Hutton Hall, a Grade II* listed building in Brentwood, Essex, England
- Hutton Hall, Hutton, Lancashire, former building in Hutton, Lancashire, England
- GWR 5957 Hutton Hall, a steam locomotive of the GWR 4900 class
