= St Margaret's Church, Huttons Ambo =

Church in Huttons Ambo, North Yorkshire, England

Coordinates: 54°06′25″N 0°50′57″W

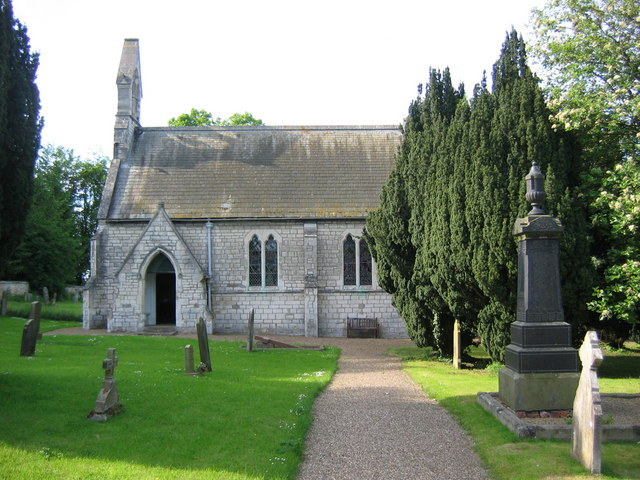
The church, in 2006

St Margaret's Church is an Anglican church in Huttons Ambo, a parish in North Yorkshire, in England.

A small church was built in the High Hutton area of the parish in the mediaeval period, with a chapel of ease in Low Hutton. The church was refurbished in the late 18th century, while the chapel was in poor repair, and was demolished in 1800. By the 1850s, the church was also in poor repair, so it was demolished and a replacement was completed in 1856. The new building was designed by Rawlins Gould, at a cost of £1,500. It was grade II listed in 1954.

The church is built of limestone with a slate roof, and is in Early English style. It consists of a nave, a north aisle, a south porch, and a chancel with an organ chamber and a north vestry. At the west end is a gabled bellcote with two lights and a quatrefoil above. Inside is the original organ, a reredos consisting 18th-century paintings on wood depicting subjects from the Bible, and four 17th-century wall tablets memorialising members of the Talbot family.

== See also ==
- Listed buildings in Huttons Ambo
