= Temple C (Selinus) =

Coordinates: 37.5832°N 12.8253°E

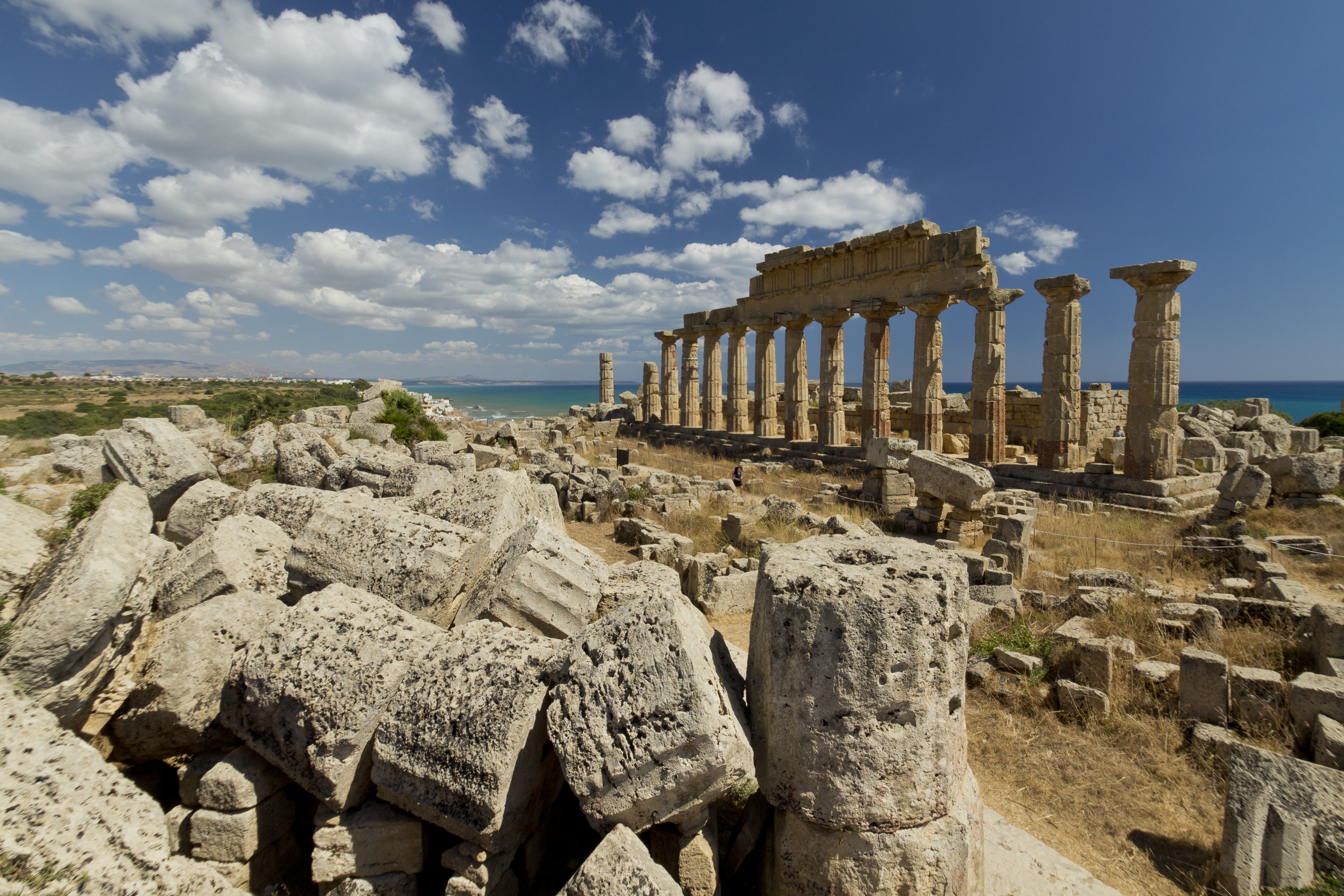
Temple C in Selinunte

Temple C at Selinus (Sicily), is a Greek temple of Magna Graecia in the Doric style. It was one of the most ancient of the temples at Selinus, having probably been built on the acropolis a little after the middle of the sixth century BC, although its dating is controversial. The temple was the object of archaeological research in the nineteenth century and beginning of the twentieth century and later the remains of a long stretch of the northern colonnade received anastylosis (reconstruction using the original material) in 1929. After a twelve-year-long restoration, in 2011 the colonnade was freed from scaffolding and made properly visible once more.

Temple C was probably used as an archive (hundreds of seals have been recovered from it) and was dedicated to Apollo, as shown by an inscription, not to Heracles.

== Description ==
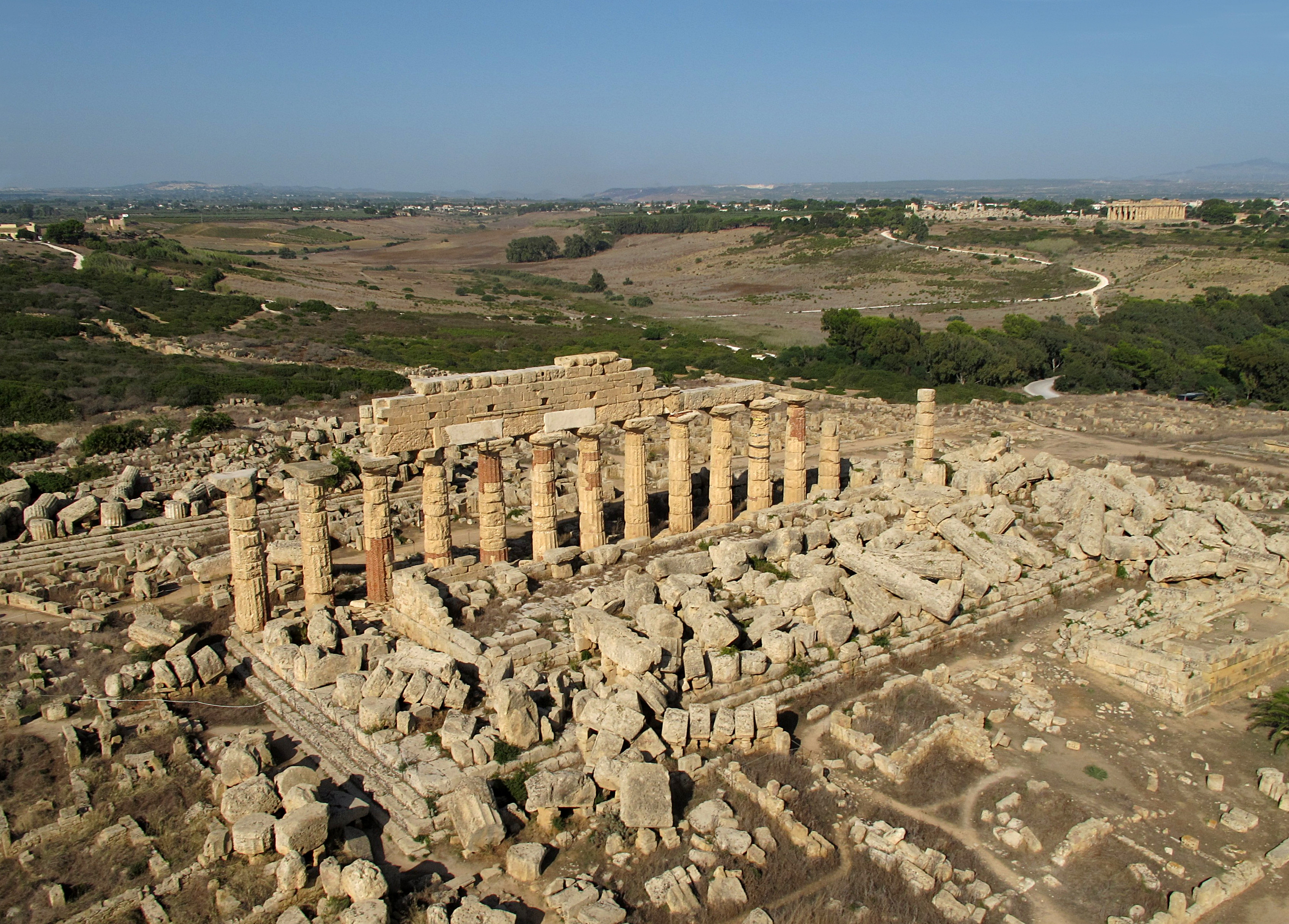
Aerial view

Although it shows archaising aspects, it imitates the models of the Greek mainland (such as the Temple of Apollo at Corinth) in the period in which the canons which would characterise the proportions of the Doric temple were becoming solidified.

British architects Samuel Angell and William Harris excavated at Selinus in the course of their tour of Sicily, and came upon the sculptured metopes from the Archaic temple of "Temple C". Although local Bourbon officials tried to stop them, they continued their work, and attempted to export their finds to England, destined for the British Museum. Now in the echos of the activities of Lord Elgin in Athens, Angell and Harris's shipments were diverted to Palermo by force of the Bourbon authorities and are now kept in the Palermo archaeological museum.

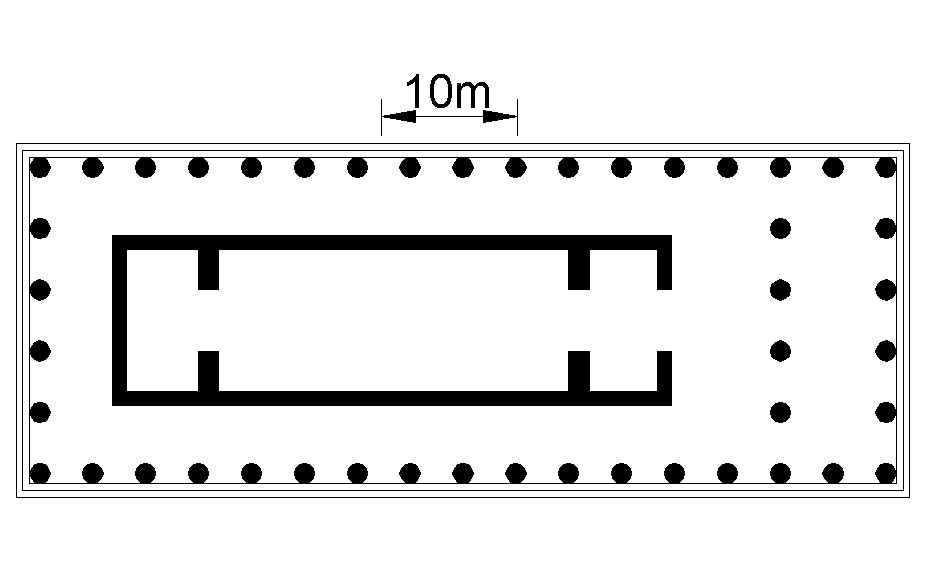
Floor plan

The building has a peristyle colonnade around the naos, with six columns at the front (hexastyle) and seventeen on its long sides, leading to a very elongated floor plan, far from the canonical 1:2 proportion, but paralleled by some other archaic temples, such as the Temple of Hera at Olympia. A flight of eight steps takes up the whole of the front side, with the rest of the crepidoma has four steps as at the temple in Corinth, following a rule which remains constant in Sicily.

The pronaos has a two rows of columns, not placed in relation to the proportions of the naos. The opisthodomos was transformed into an empty space behind the naos (adyton), as is common among the doric temples of Magna Graecia. The columns were exceptionally slender (8.65 metres high) and the intercolumniation was wide in the facade, but on the sides was contracted to a more sensible dimension. The columns' diameters vary widely, following a flexible pattern with little regard for the rules of the Doric order, which had already become strict in Mainland Greece.

The entablature was unusually high with a cornice made of two rows of stone blocks, surmounted by a gutter (sima) in coloured and decorated terracotta, some traces of which have been found and are now kept in the Antonino Salinas Regional Archeological Museum, along with some notable metopai of the frieze.

== Sculptural decoration ==
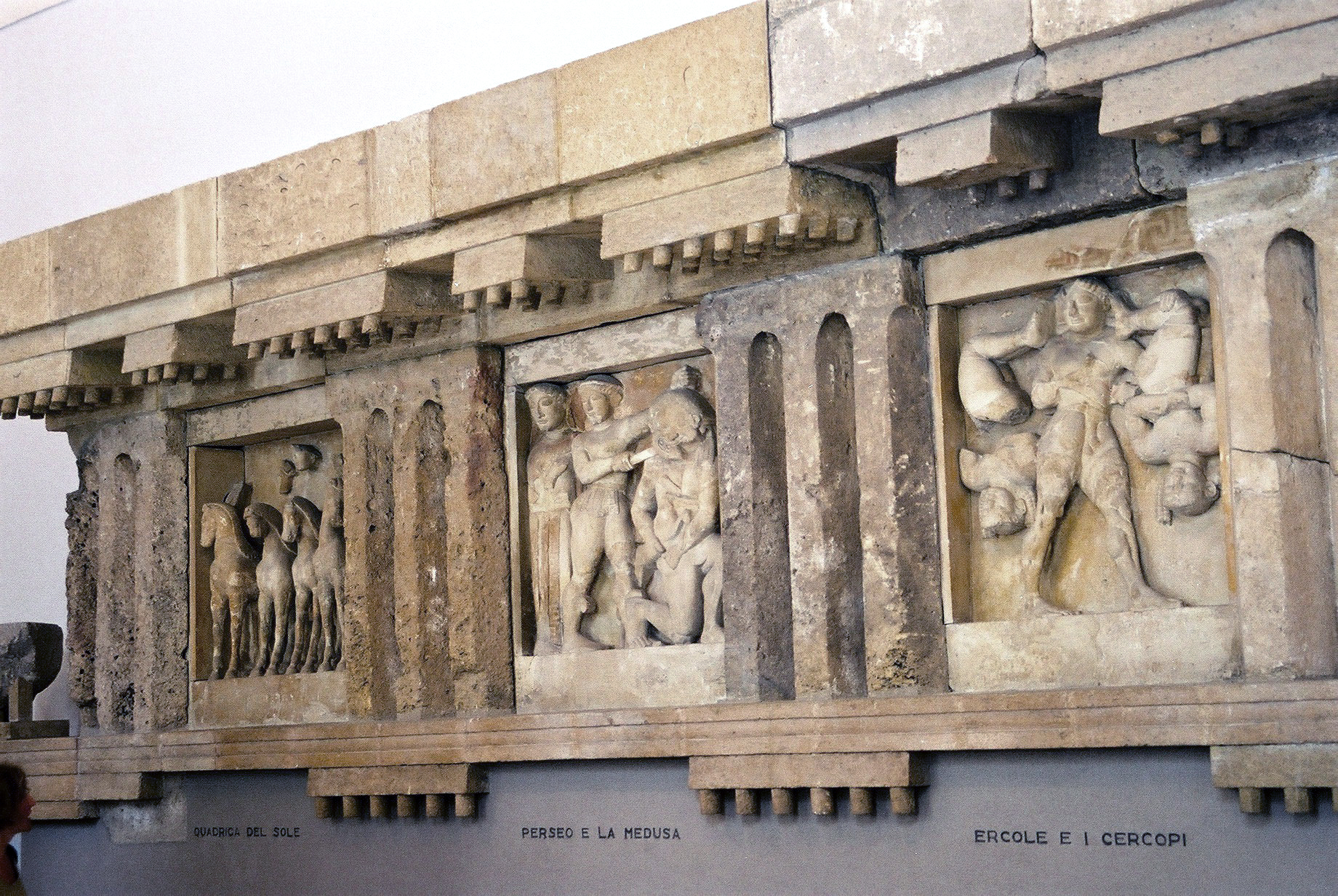
The metopes of Temple C; Museo archeologico di Palermo

The ten metopai of the facade were sculpted in high relief and framed at the top and bottom by blank slabs which made the relief of the sculpture stand out. The metopes were separated by triglyphs which jut out a long way from the vertical plane of the metopes. Three metopes survive in full: a frontal view of a quadriga being driven vigorously by Helios, Perseus decapitating Medusa while Athena looks on, Heracles carrying the captured Cercopes on his shoulders. In the centre of the tympanum there was the mask of a Gorgon in terracotta.

== Bibliography ==
- Charbonneaux, Jean; Martin, Roland; Villard, François (1969). Rizzoli (ed.). La Grecia arcaica : (620-480 a.C.). Milan. Charbonneaux, Martin, Villard 1969. [ISBN unspecified]
- Guido, Margaret; Tusa, Vincenzo (1978). Guida archeologica della Sicilia. Palermo: Sellerio. pp. 68–80.
- Richter, Gisela M. A. (1969). Einaudi (ed.). L'arte greca. Turin. Richter 1969.
- Audio guides temple C and metopes
