= Museum Street Tavern =

Listed pub in York, England

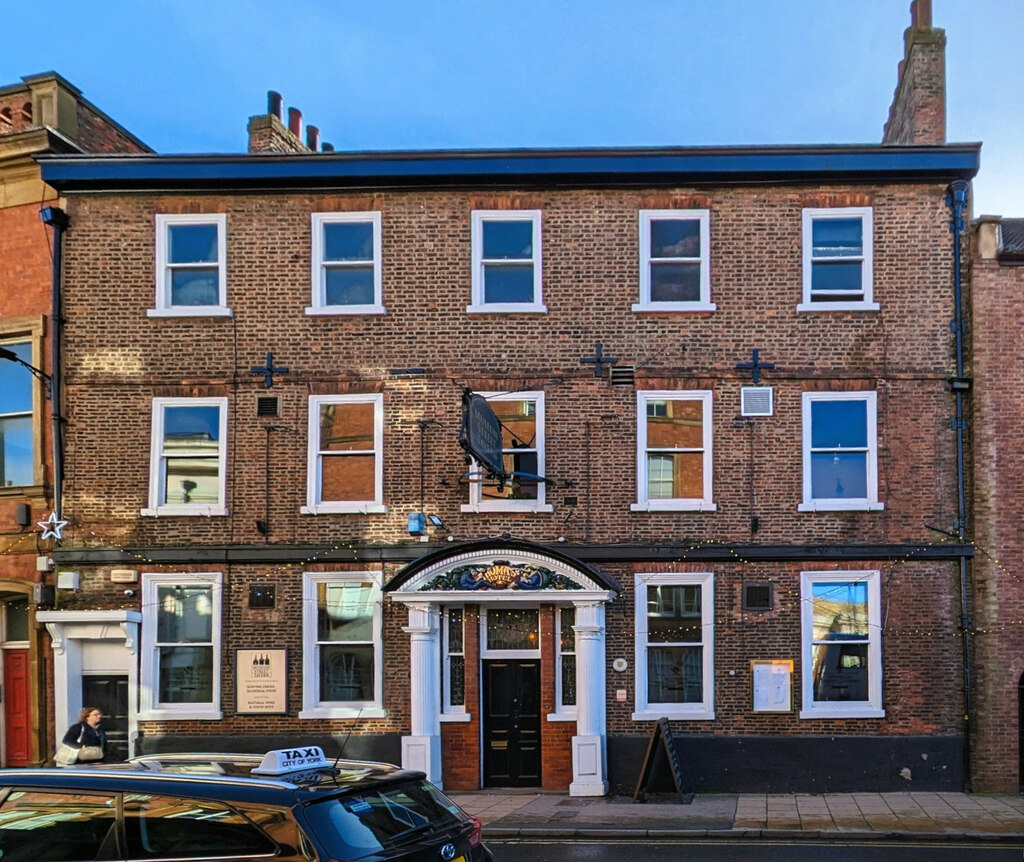
- The pub in 2024
- Former names: Thomas's of York

General information
- Type: Public house (formerly a hotel, then restaurant; originally a house)
- Location: Museum Street, York, England
- Coordinates: 53°57′40″N 1°05′08″W
- Year built: Early 18th century

Design and construction
- Designations

Listed Building – Grade II
- Official name: 3, Museum Street
- Designated: 24 January 1978
- Reference no.: 1257111

The Museum Street Tavern, formerly Thomas's of York (and officially listed as 3 Museum Street), is a historic public house in the city centre of York, England.

The building was first constructed in about 1700. Around 1800 it became part of Ettridge's Royal Hotel, and in the 1820s it was heightened from two to three storeys. In 1858, it was bought by William Thomas, an experienced hotelier, who renamed the hotel after himself. The remainder of the old hotel was demolished, and the Museum Street facade of the surviving building was altered, with work completed in 1863. Thomas sold the pub in 1876 to Thomas Lightfoot, a brewer from Bedale, but its name was retained. In 1900 it was purchased by John Smith's Brewery. At that time it had eight bedrooms, a bar, two drawing rooms, a coffee room and a billiard room.

Main entrance to the pub in 2026

The building is constructed of buff-brown brick. The staircase and some first-floor doors are original, while the fireplaces and some plasterwork date from the 1863 alterations. Late-19th-century stained glass surrounds the wide entrance door, with a colourful design in the tympanum above incorporating the name "Thomas's Hotel".

The pub was Grade II listed in 1978. By 2022 it was owned by the Stonegate Pub Company, which closed it for conversion into a Be At One cocktail bar. In 2023 it reopened as the Museum Street Tavern.

== See also ==
- Listed buildings in York (within the city walls, northern part)
