= York Library =

Listed building in York, England

- The library in 2018
- 53.9614°N 1.0862°W
- Location: Museum Street, York, England
- Established: 1794; 232 years ago; – as subscription library; 1893; 133 years ago; – as public library; 1917; 109 years ago; – as merged library
- Architects: Brierley and Rutherford (1927)

Other information
- Website: exploreyork.org.uk

Designations

Listed Building – Grade II
- Official name: Central Library
- Designated: 14 March 1997
- Reference no.: 1257077

York Library (York Explore Library and Archive) is situated on Museum Street in York, England. It became a Grade II listed building in 1997.

York's first subscription library opened in 1794, but it was only in 1893 that the city's first public library was established on Clifford Street by the then Duke and Duchess of York, in a building formerly occupied by the Institute of Popular Science and Literature. This was the period when free public libraries were supplanting subscription libraries, and the creation of York's public library was the city's way of marking Queen Victoria's Diamond Jubilee. In 1917 the public library was merged with the York Subscription Library.

The present library building on Museum Street was designed by Brierley and Rutherford, the firm of Walter Brierley, and opened in 1927. Nikolaus Pevsner described the building critically as a belated use of Edwardian Baroque. Since its opening there have been several extensions, most recently in 2014, when the library became home to the City Archives.

== See also ==
- Listed buildings in York (within the city walls, northern part)
