= River House, York =

Listed building in York, England

River House
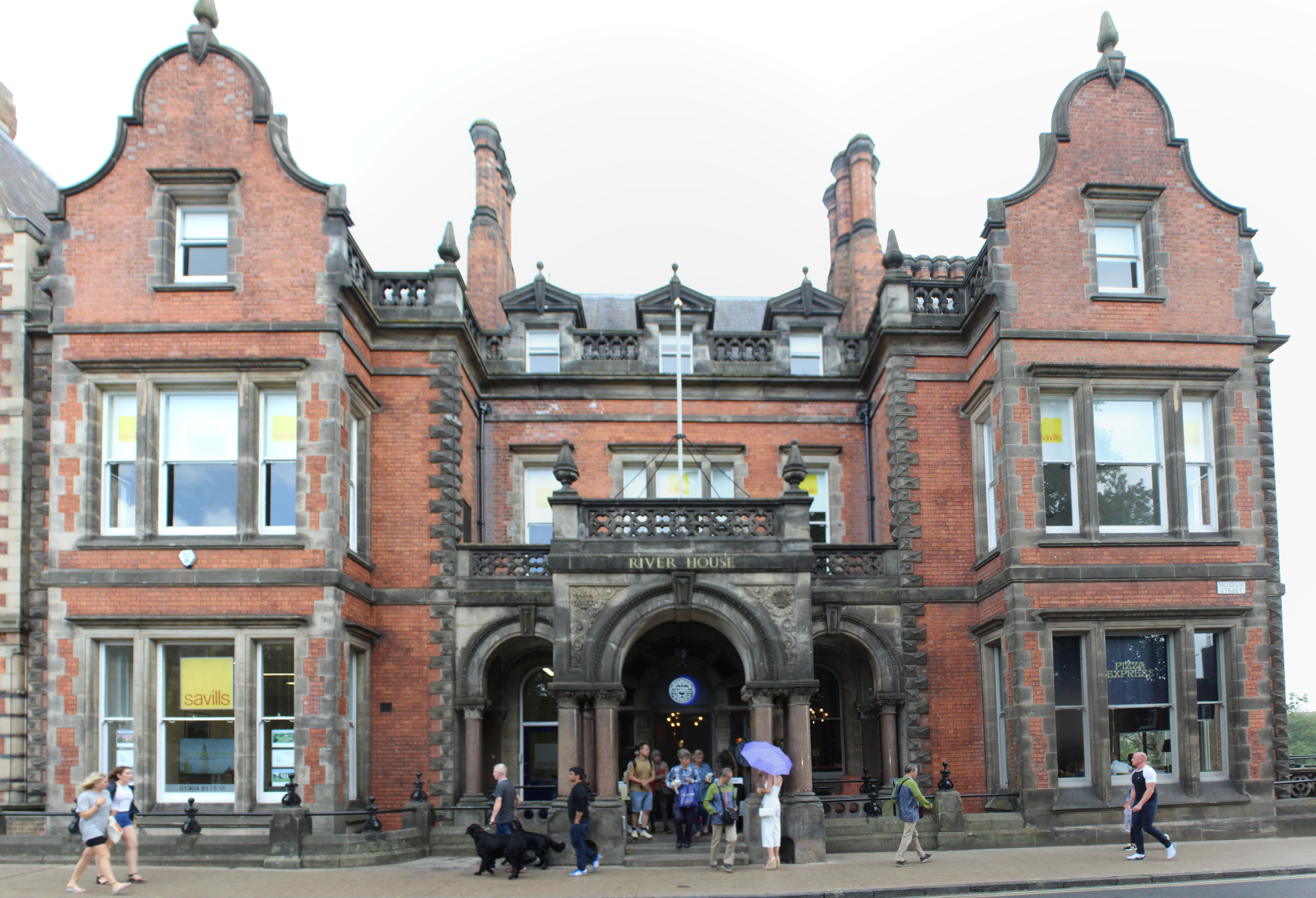
- Museum Street façade of River House, in 2018

- Location within York City Centre

General information
- Location: Museum Street, York, England
- Coordinates: 53.96041°N 1.08650°W
- Year built: 1868
- Renovated: 2017 (refurbished)

Design and construction
- Architect: Charles Jocelyn Parnell

Listed Building – Grade II
- Official name: River House and attached area walls and railings
- Designated: 19 August 1971
- Reference no.: 1257074

River House is a historic building on Museum Street in the city centre of York, England.

The building was constructed in 1868 as the premises of the Yorkshire Club. The club had been founded in 1839 at 5 St Leonard's Place and expanded after absorbing the Yorkshire Union Hunt Club in 1856. With a larger membership, it decided to move to bigger, purpose-built premises on a prominent site on the south side of Museum Street, next to Lendal Bridge. The location provided a private waterfront area on the River Ouse, now the Lendal Boatyard. Inside, the club contained a dining room, bar, billiards room, studies and bedrooms.

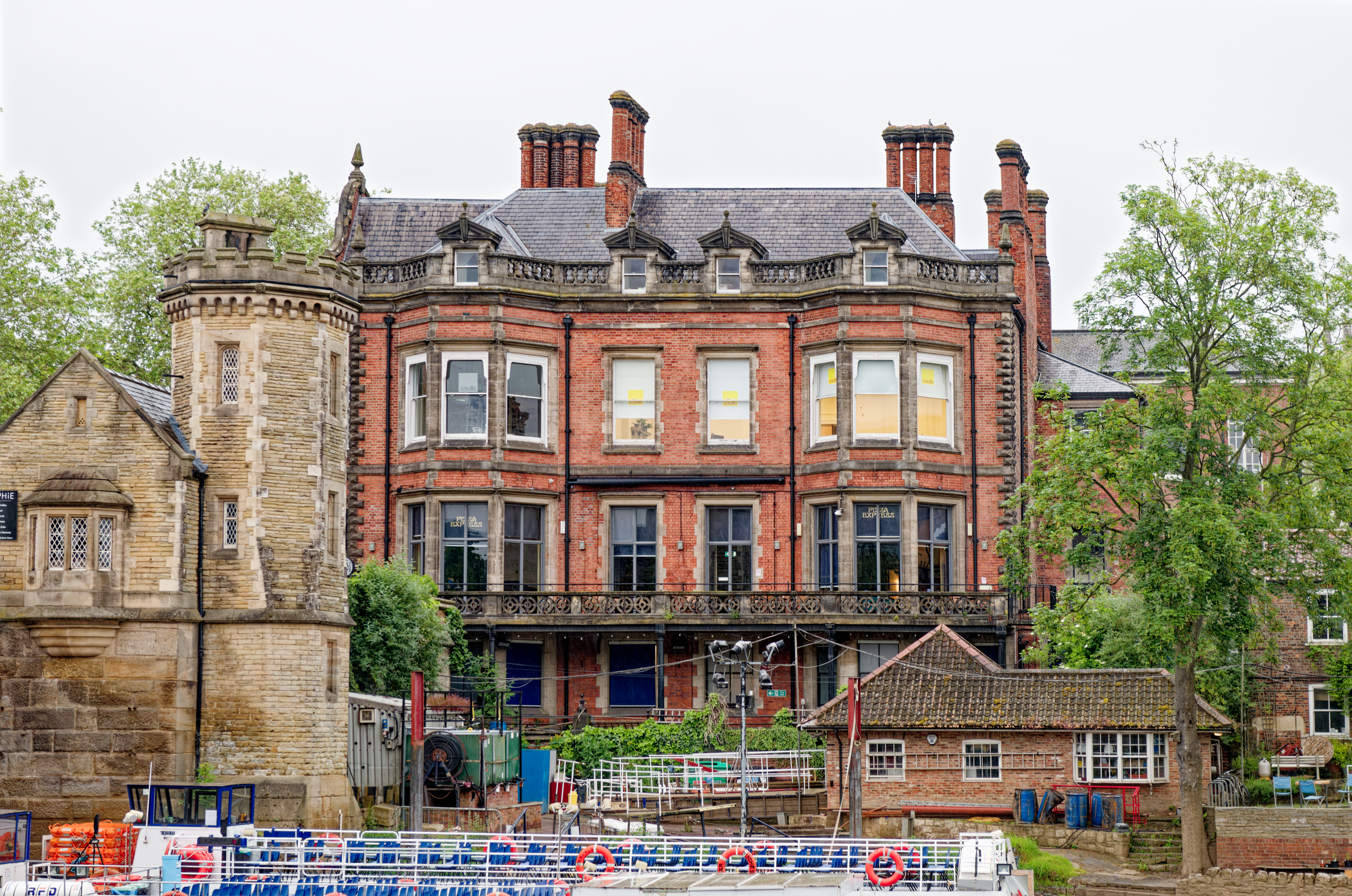
River façade of River House, in 2024

The club closed some time after the Second World War, and the building was converted to offices. It was designated Grade II in 1971. By 1980, it housed Savills estate agents. From the early 2000s, Pizza Express occupied half the building. It was refurbished in 2017.

The building was designed by Charles Jocelyn Parnell. It is built of brick with stone dressings and quoins, and granite columns. It has a basement, two main storeys, and attics. The central section is three bays wide, with single-bay wings on either side. On the Museum Street front, a portico fills the space between the wings, with a balcony above and a projecting porch in the centre. The river front is of four bays, with the basement above ground level and a ground floor terrace supported by cast-iron columns.

== See also ==
- Listed buildings in York (within the city walls, northern part)
