= Rawlins Gould =

Rawlins Gould (1821 – 18 March 1873) was an English architect.

Gould completed an apprenticeship as an architect, in the office of George Townsend Andrews. In 1855, Andrews made him a partner. Andrews died a few months later, and Gould took over the practice.

Gould died in 1873, and in his will he left £500 to the York Charity Trustees, to be invested in stock, the dividends to be used to buy bread, to be distributed annually to ten poor widows.

Gould's buildings include:

- St Margaret's Church, Huttons Ambo (1856)
- 1 Museum Street, York (1860)
- Holy Trinity Church, King's Court, York (1861; demolished)
- Hornsea railway station (1864)
- Bootham Park Hospital Chapel, York (1865)
- East Riding Bank, Malton (1866)
- York Lodge, Heworth (1869)
