= Huttons Ambo =

Civil parish in North Yorkshire, England

Coordinates: 54.113°N 0.854°W

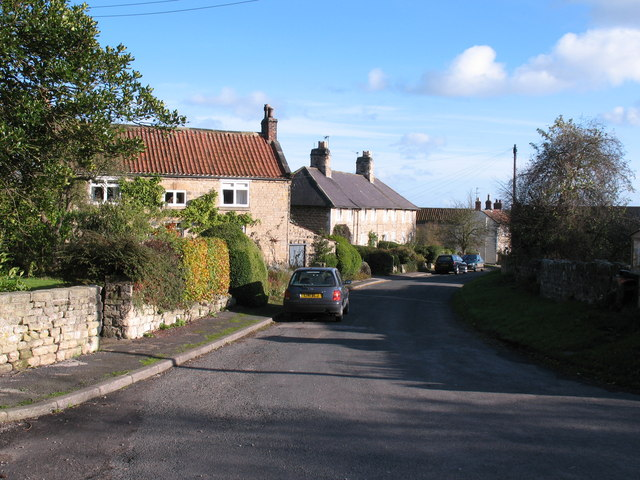
- High Hutton

- Location within North Yorkshire
- Population: 270 (2011 census)
- OS grid reference: SE761677
  - London: 190 mi (310 km) south
- Unitary authority: North Yorkshire
- Ceremonial county: North Yorkshire
- Region: Yorkshire and the Humber
- Country: England
- Sovereign state: United Kingdom
- Post town: YORK
- Postcode district: YO60
- Police: North Yorkshire
- Fire: North Yorkshire
- Ambulance: Yorkshire
- UK Parliament: Thirsk and Malton

Huttons Ambo is a civil parish in the county of North Yorkshire, England. It is about 14 miles (22.5 km) north-east of York and 3 miles (4.8 km) south-west of Malton. The civil parish of Huttons Ambo consists of the villages of High Hutton and Low Hutton.

== History ==
The villages are mentioned in the Domesday Book as Hotun in the Bulford hundred. The lands were divided between Cnut, son of Karli, Thorkil and Thorbrand son of Kalri. After the Norman invasion, the lands were split between the King and Berengar of Tosny. The land at Low Hutton owned by the King, has been named Hutton Colswayn, whilst the land near Hutton Hill has been known as Hutton Mynchon. The land at High Hutton has been known as Hutton Bardolf. All these suffixes indicate the names of the landowners of those times. The Colswayn family may have been given the land by the Crown for duties performed guarding York Castle. The titles passed on to the Bolton family. The other lands came into the possession of the Gower family, some of whom held the office of High Sheriff of York, such as Sir Thomas Gower. Memorials to members of this family can be seen in the Church.

Hutton, the toponym, derives from the Old English hōh tūn, meaning settlement on or by the hill spur. Ambo, the suffix, is Latin indicating the combination of the two villages into the one parish.

Archaeological excavations in the 1950s revealed evidence of 12th- or 13th-century fortified buildings at the south end of the village of Low Hutton near the river. Huttons Ambo lends its name to a specific type of Medieval pottery produced here in the 13th century consisting of large, unglazed storage jars.

Further excavations carried out in 2023, 2024 and 2025 by Ethos Heritage CIC uncovered a 12th to 13th-century building that may be connected with a lost manor house mentioned in village records. The building reused what appears to be Roman stone that may have come from a nearby Roman building During the excavations in 2025 a previously unknown and first Roman site was identified in the village which produced late Roman pottery dating to the end of the 4th century along with a number of Roman coins.

In addition, the excavations also identified Post Medieval structures including a capped stone gully and a previously unknown building in the southern end of the village which seems to have been occupied from the late 17th to the mid 19th century. The stone used in its construction may have been recycled from an earlier fortified buildings that lie 160 yards (150 m) away.

Evidence of Iron Age and Roman and medieval occupation was also uncovered during the excavations near the river. The site which is surrounded by a large bank and ditch contained pottery dating from c. 50 BC to c. 300 AD.

== Governance ==
The villages lie within the Thirsk and Malton UK Parliament constituency. From 1974 to 2023 it was part of the district of Ryedale, it is now administered by the unitary North Yorkshire Council.

== Geography ==
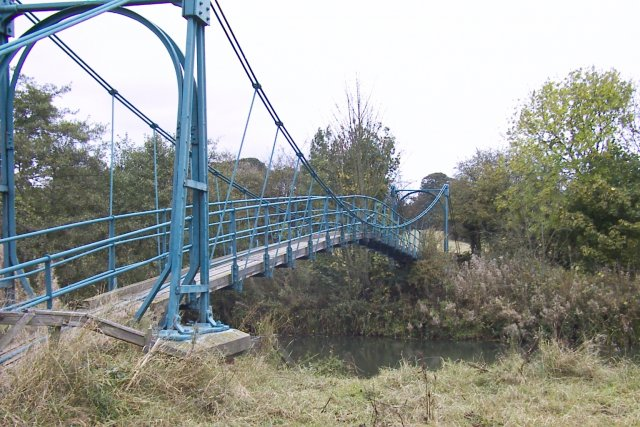
Foot bridge over the river Derwent at Huttons Ambo

Since UK Census records began, the highest recorded population in the parish was 445 in 1821. According to the 2001 UK Census the population is 287. Of these, 225 were over sixteen years of age and 125 of them were in employment. There were 135 dwellings, of which 72 were detached. The Census 2011 showed a population of 270.

There are a total of 17 Grade II Listed Buildings in the parish.

The nearest settlements are Malton 3 miles (4.8 km) to the north-east and Crambeck 1.3 miles (2.1 km) to the south-west. The elevation in High Hutton reaches a peak of 260 feet (79 m) and 170 feet (52 m) in Low Hutton.

The villages are situated between the A64 York to Scarborough road and the River Derwent, Yorkshire.

== Transport ==
There used to be a station in the village that was a stop on the York to Scarborough Line run by York and North Midland Railway. Opened in 1845, it closed in 1966.

== Religion ==
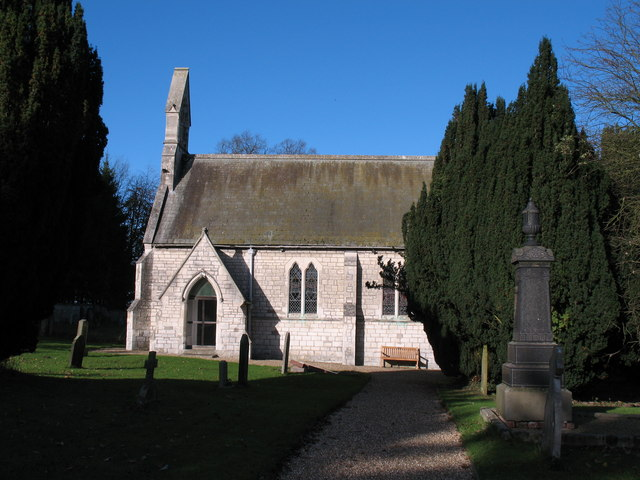
St Margaret's, High Hutton

St Margaret's Church, Huttons Ambo was rebuilt in 1856 on the site of the original building. It is a Grade II Listed Building.

There used to be a Primitive Methodist Chapel in Low Hutton and a Wesleyan Chapel in High Hutton.

== See also ==
- Listed buildings in Huttons Ambo
