= Topping & Company =

British bookshop chain

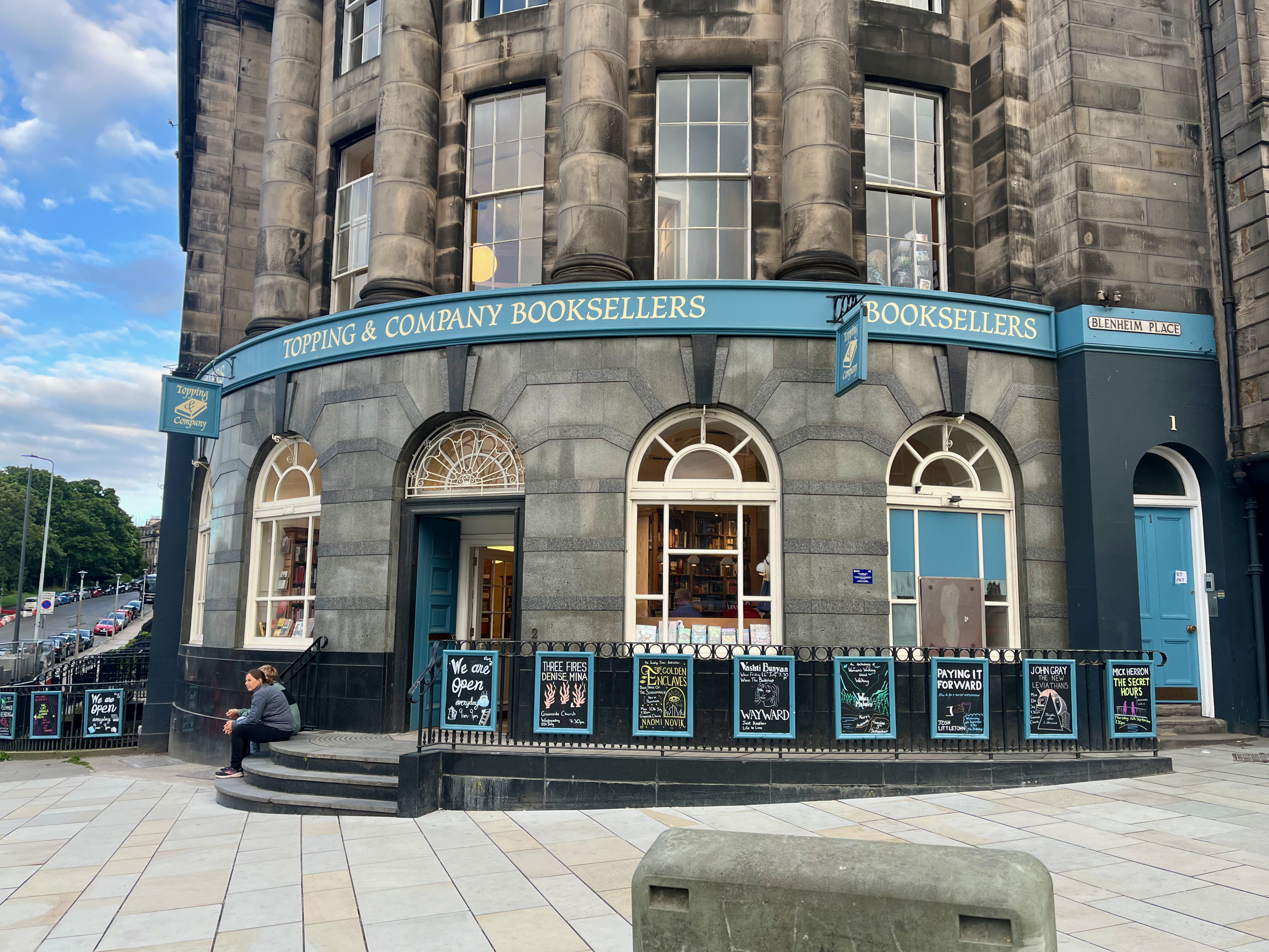
Branch in Edinburgh

Topping & Company is a British independent bookshop chain. It was founded in Ely in 2002 by Robert and Louise Topping, who as of 2026 continue to own it.

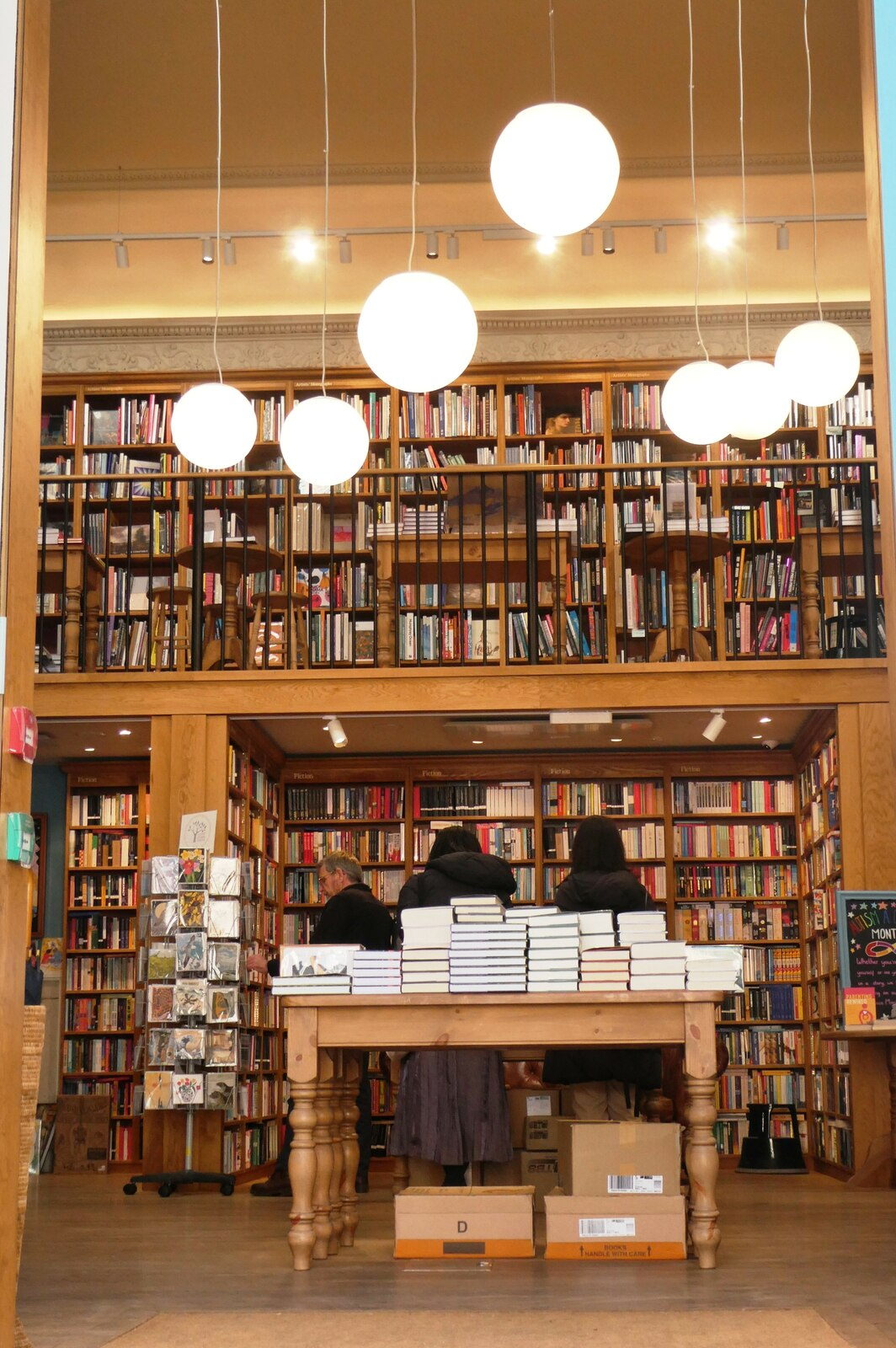
Interior of branch in Bath, Somerset
