= Metope =

Architectural element in the Doric order

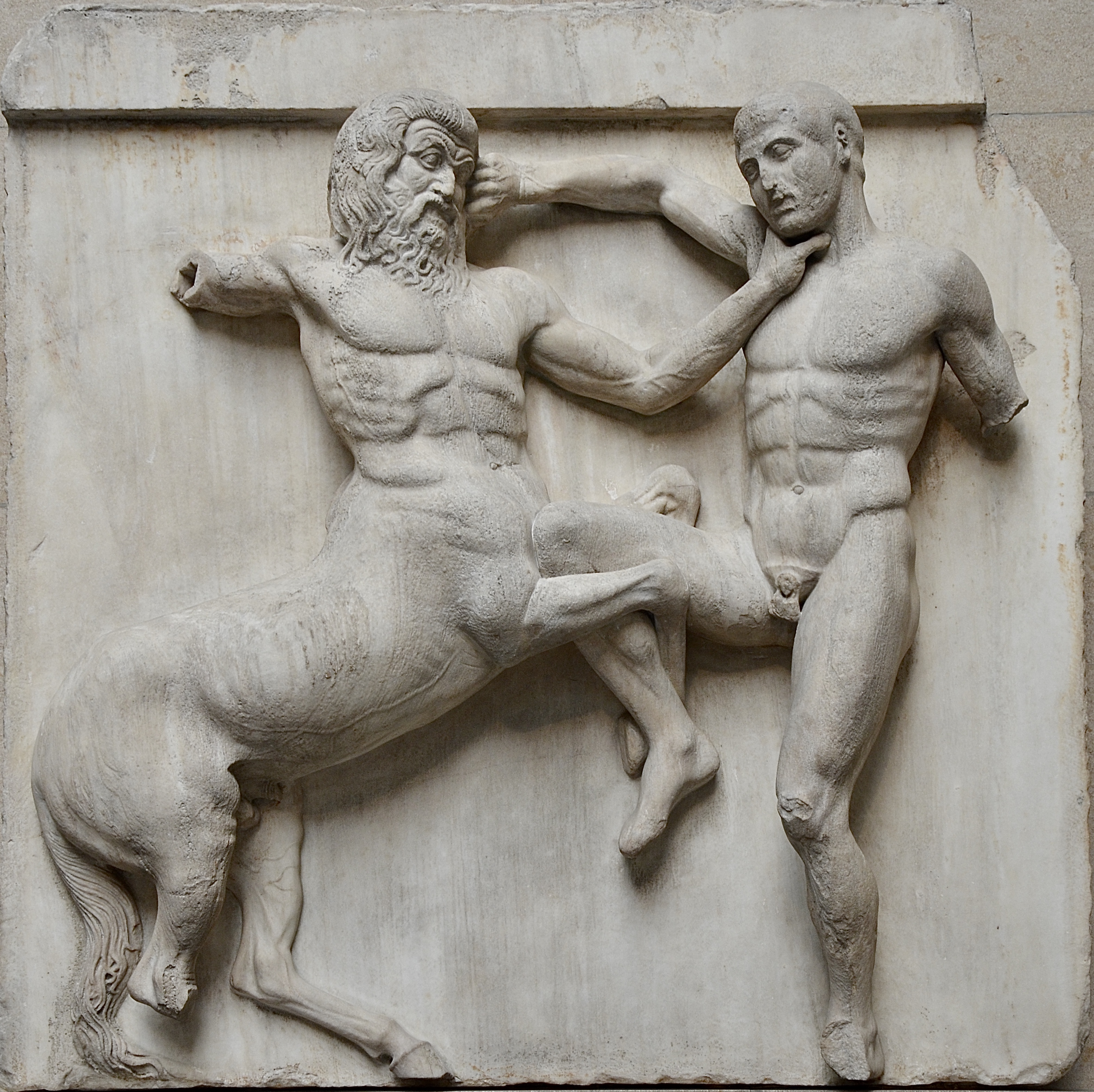
Metope from the Parthenon marbles depicting part of the battle between the Centaurs and the Lapiths; 442–438 BC; marble; height: 1.06 m; British Museum (London)

A metope (/ˈmɛtəpi/; Ancient Greek: μετόπη) is a rectangular architectural element of the Doric order, filling the space between triglyphs in a frieze, a decorative band above an architrave. In earlier wooden buildings the spaces between triglyphs were first open, and later the free spaces in between triglyphs were closed with metopes; however, metopes are not load-bearing part of a building. Earlier metopes are plain, but later metopes were painted or ornamented with reliefs. The painting on most metopes has been lost, but sufficient traces remain to allow a close idea of their original appearance.

In terms of structure, metopes were made out of clay or stone. A stone metope may be carved from a single block with a triglyph (or triglyphs), or they may be cut separately and slide into slots in the triglyph blocks as at the Temple of Aphaea. Sometimes the metopes and friezes were cut from different stone, so as to provide color contrast. Although they tend to be close to square in shape, some metopes are noticeably larger in height or in width. They may also vary in width within a single structure to allow for corner contraction, an adjustment of the column spacing and arrangement of the Doric frieze in a temple to make the design appear more harmonious.

Some of the earliest surviving examples are stone metopes from a peripteral temple at Mycenae, ca. late 7th century BC, and painted clay metopes from Thermus, ca. early 6th century BC. The high-point of relief sculpture on metopes is exemplified by the 92 metopes of the Parthenon, metopes of the temple of Zeus at Olympia, together with the metopes of Temple C at Selinus.

== Gallery ==
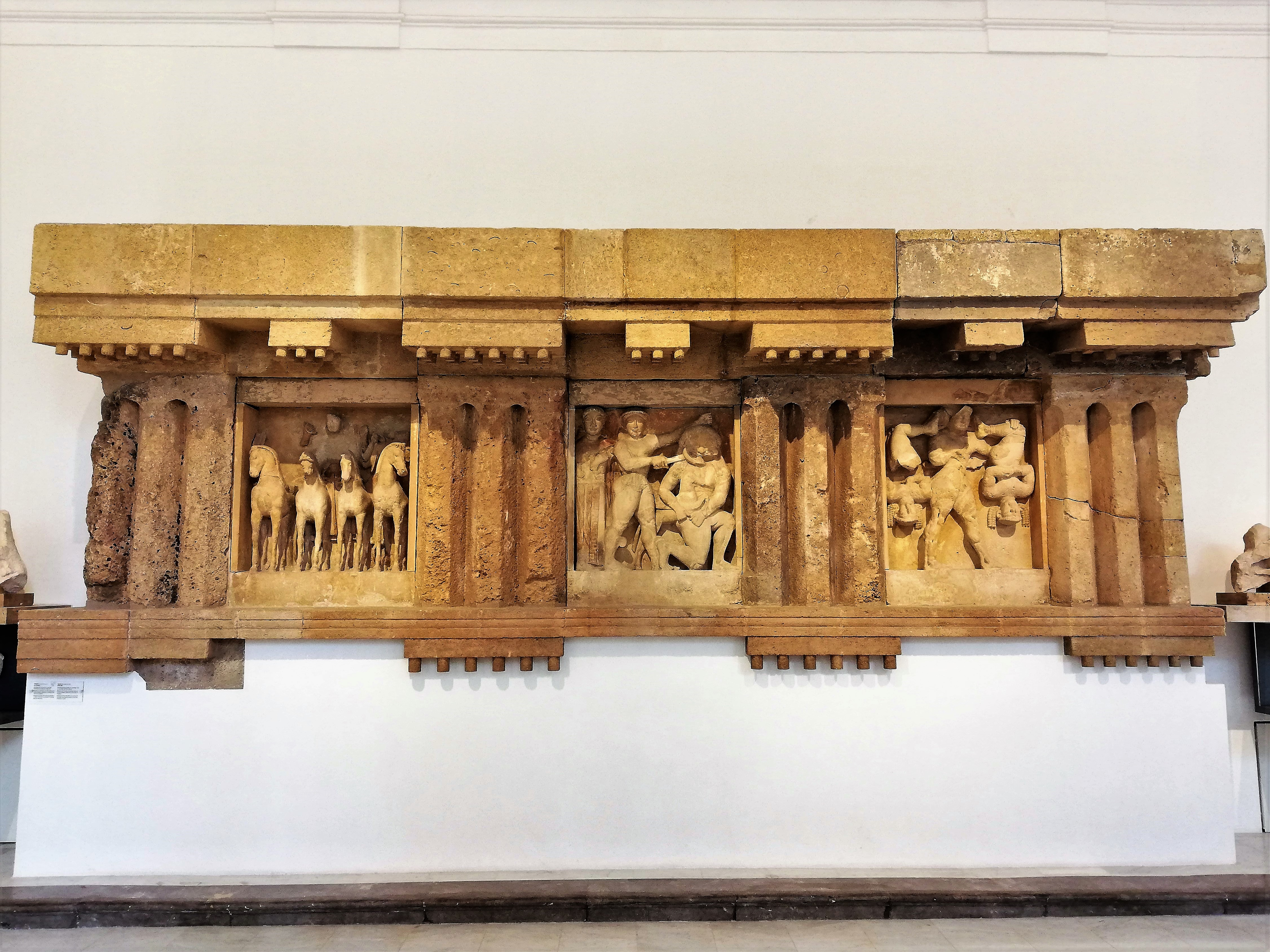
Triglyphs and metopes from the Temple C at Selinus, c. 560 BC, in the Antonino Salinas Regional Archeological Museum (Palermo, Italy)

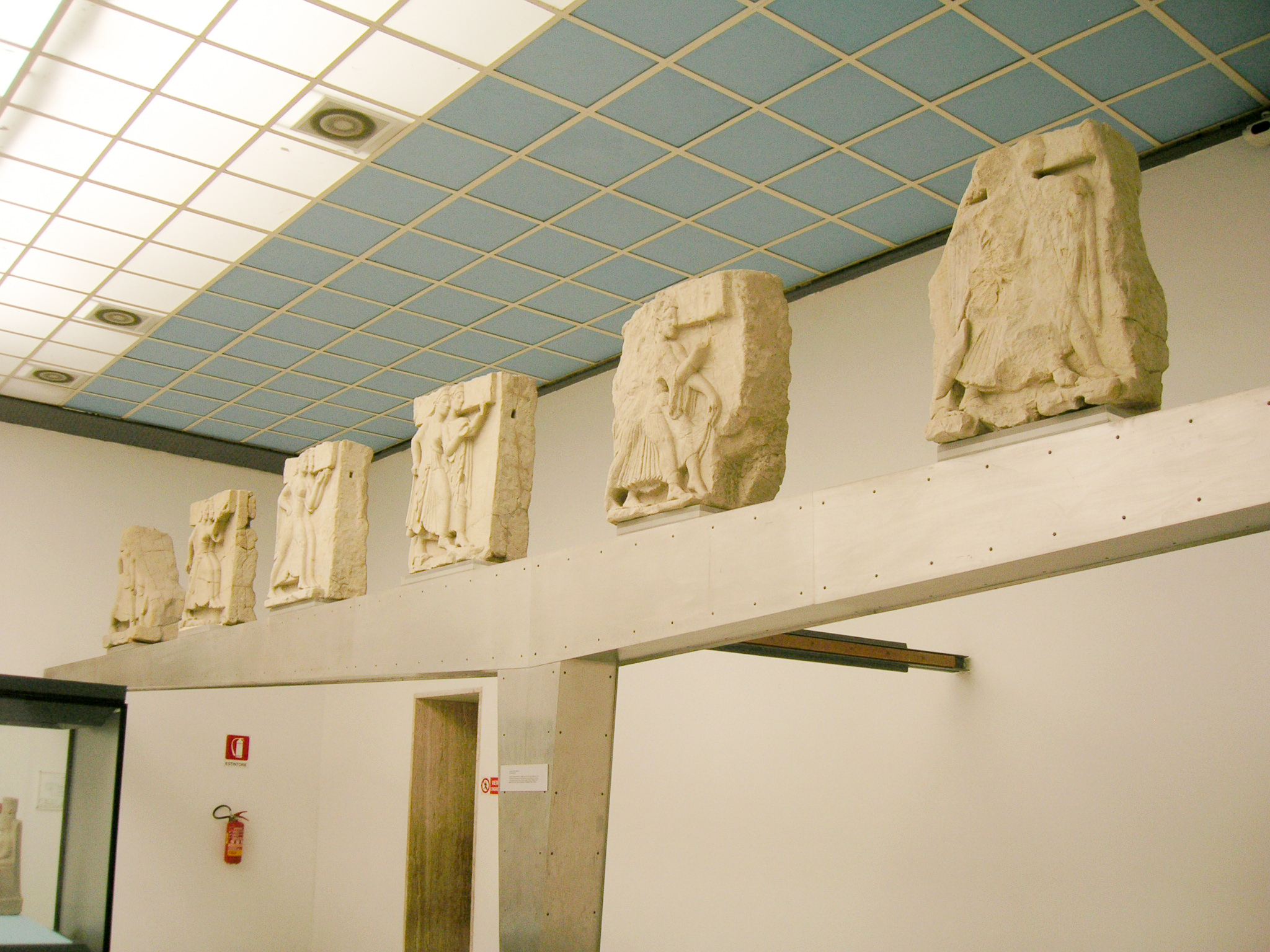
Metopes from the second group at Foce del Sele, National Archaeological Museum of Paestum, Capaccio-Paestum, Italy

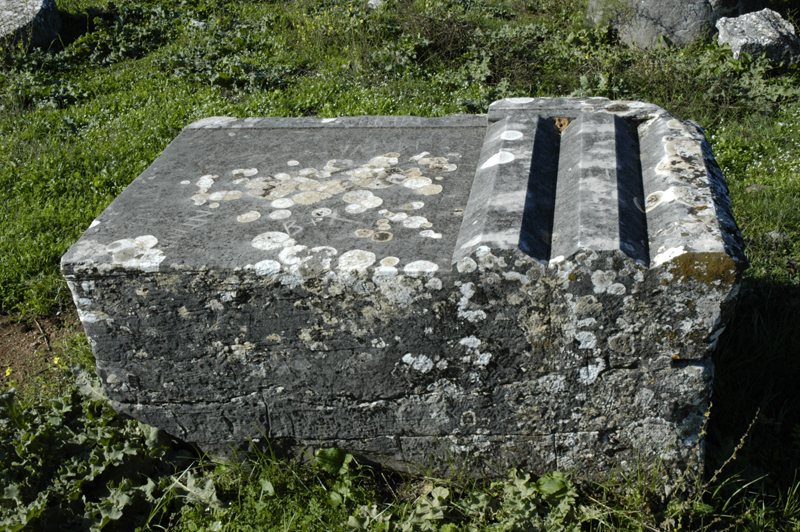
A metope (L) and triglyph (R) cut from one block from Stratos

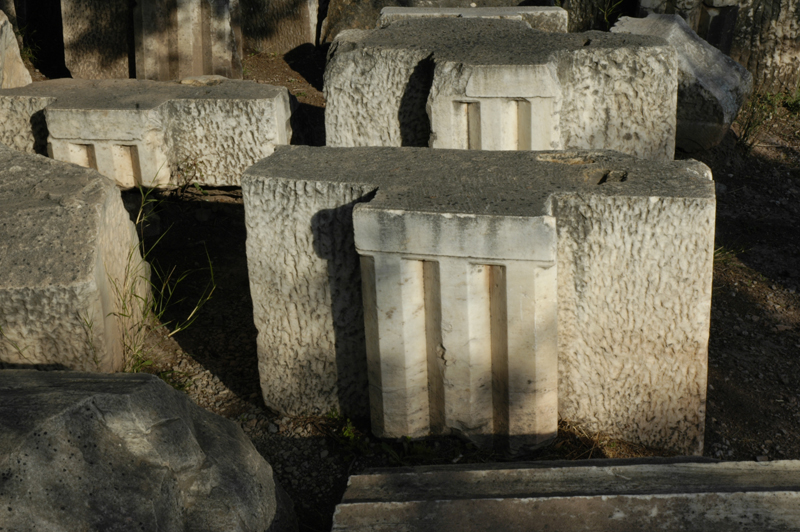
Triglyph blocks with slots for the insertion of metopes in the Marmaria at Delphi

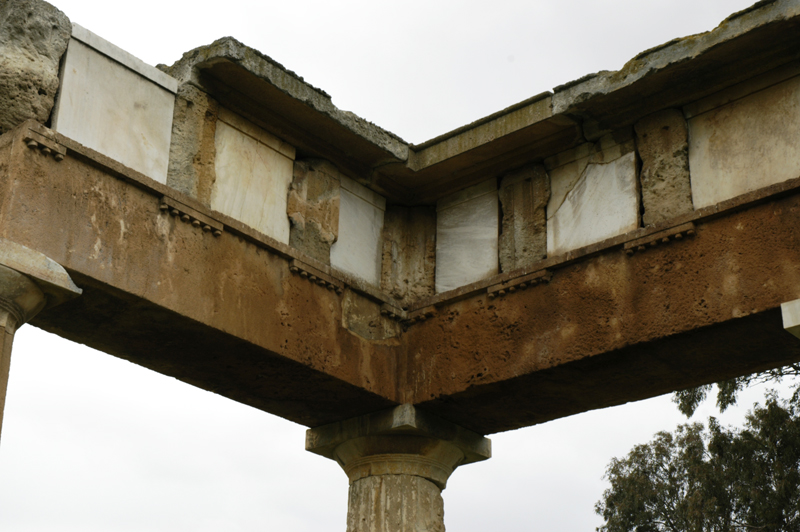
Metopes made from marble slotted into the frieze of the Stoa at Brauron

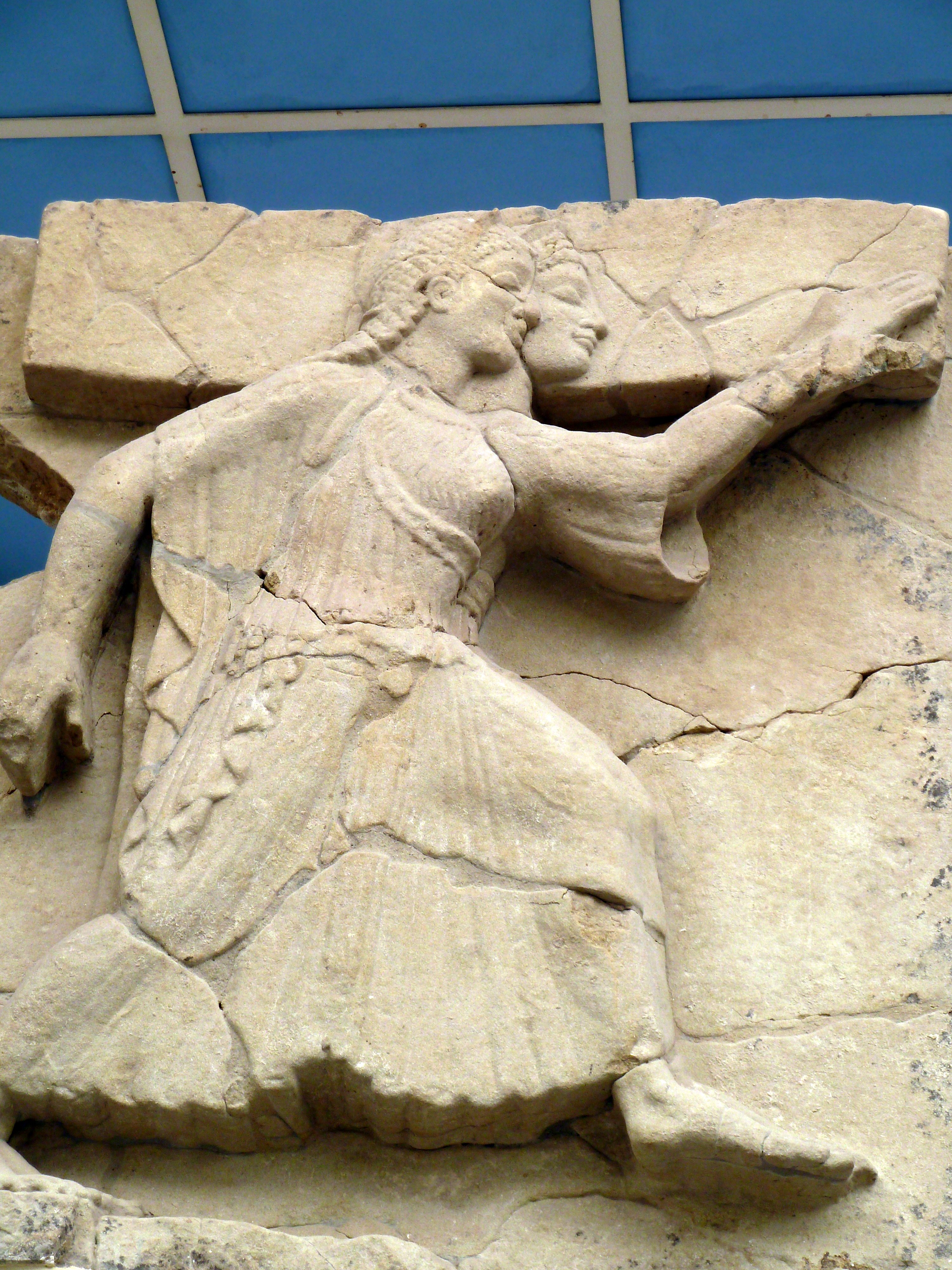
Section of metope frieze from a temple near Paestum, c. 510 BC

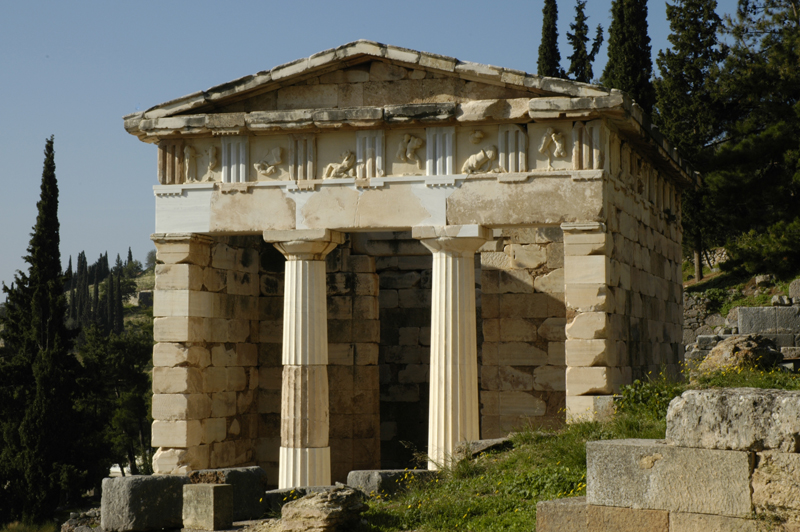
Metopes with sculptural decoration in the Doric frieze of the Treasury of the Athenians at Delphi

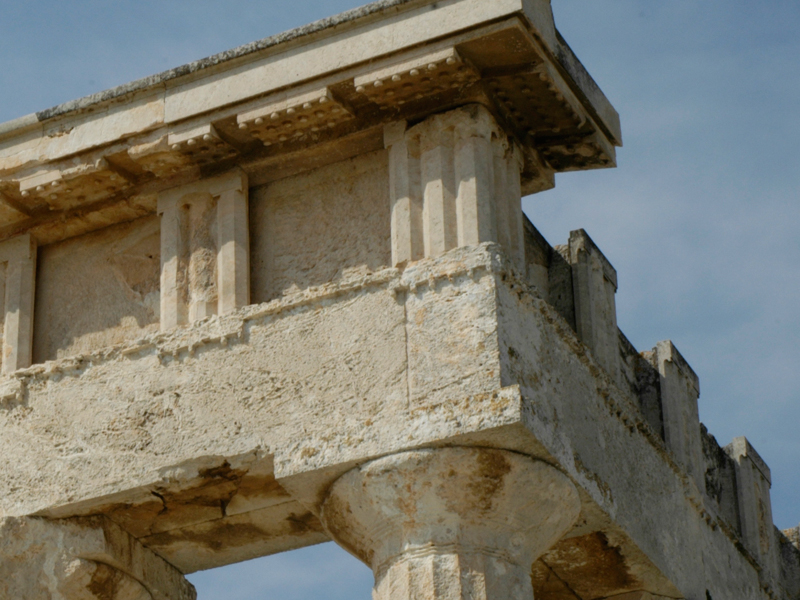
Frieze of the Temple of Aphaea with triglyphs slotted for metopes

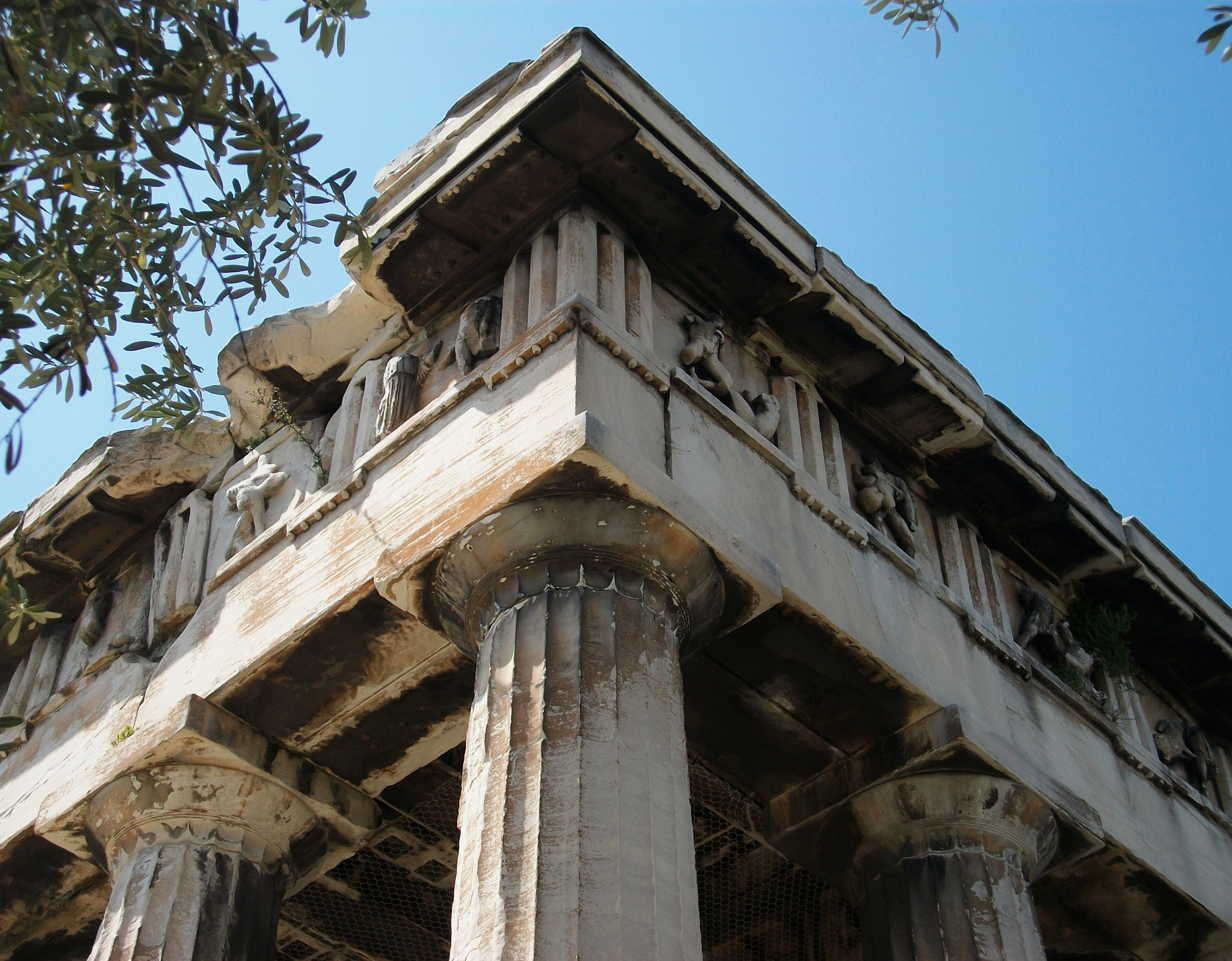
The entablature of the Hephaisteion (temple of Hephaistos) in Athens, showing Doric frieze with sculpted metopes

Metopes of the Äußeres Burgtor of the Hofburg Palace in Vienna with bronze medallions and golden laurels

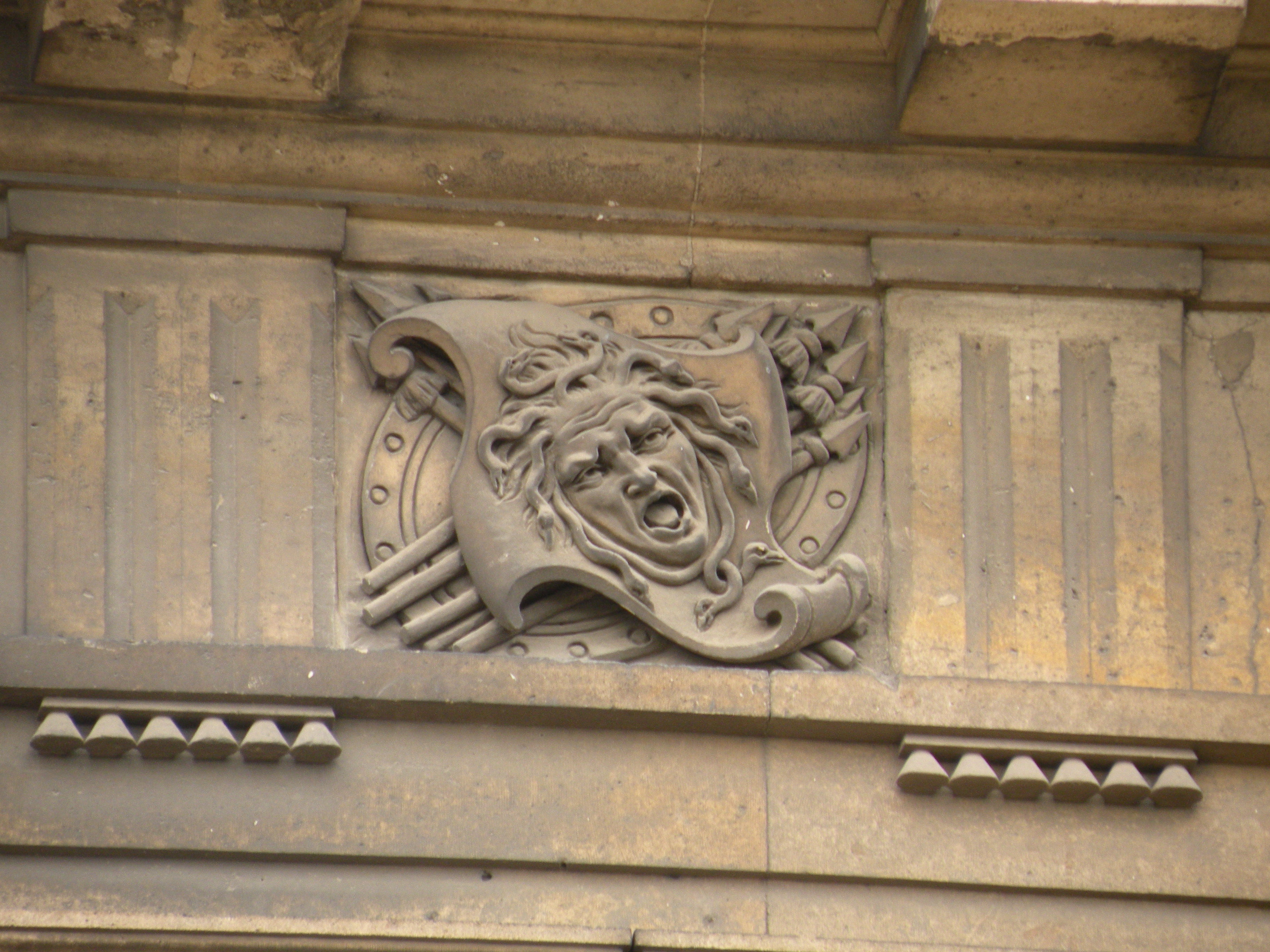
Metope on a façade of the Château de Maisons-Laffitte in France, an example of French Baroque architecture, by François Mansart

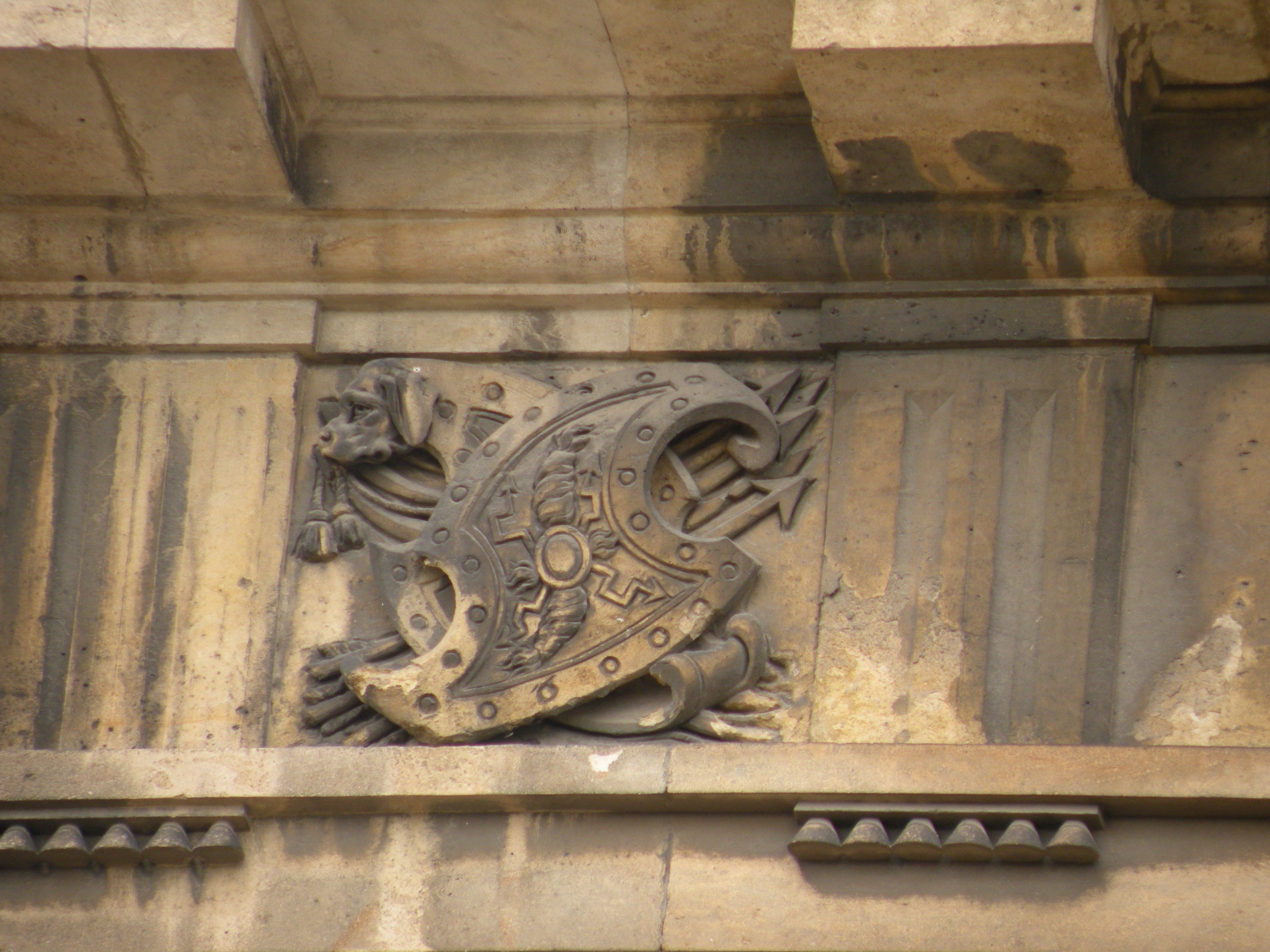
Another metope of the Château de Maisons-Laffitte

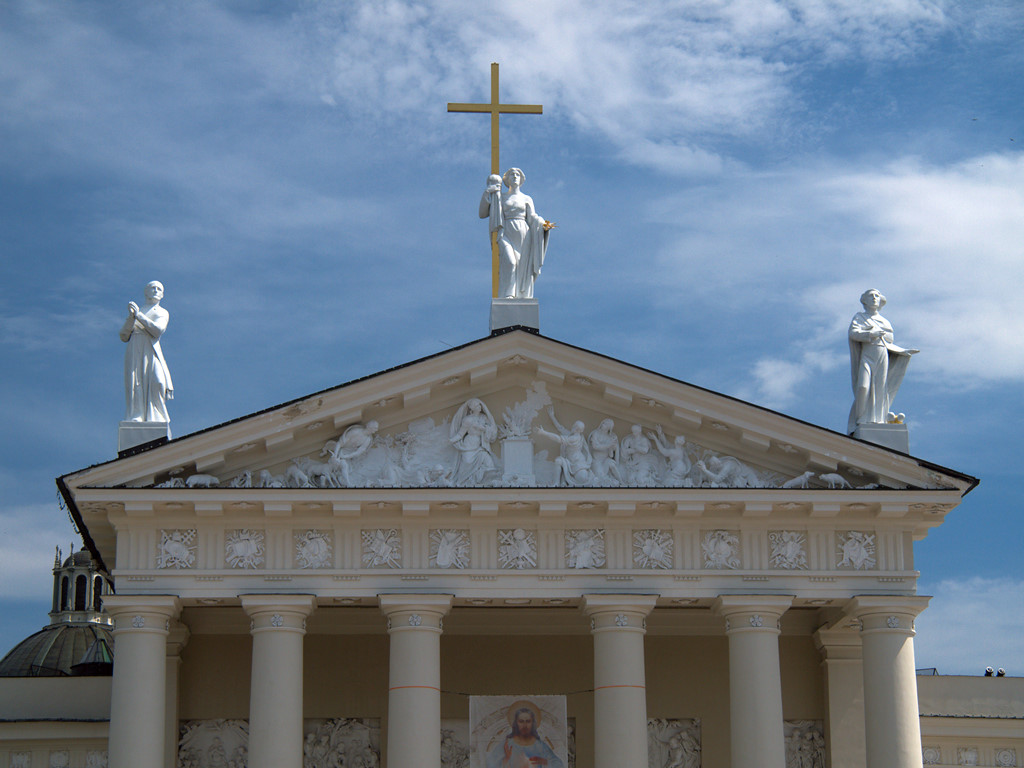
Metopes on a façade of the Vilnius Cathedral in Vilnius, Lithuania with Christian liturgical insignia

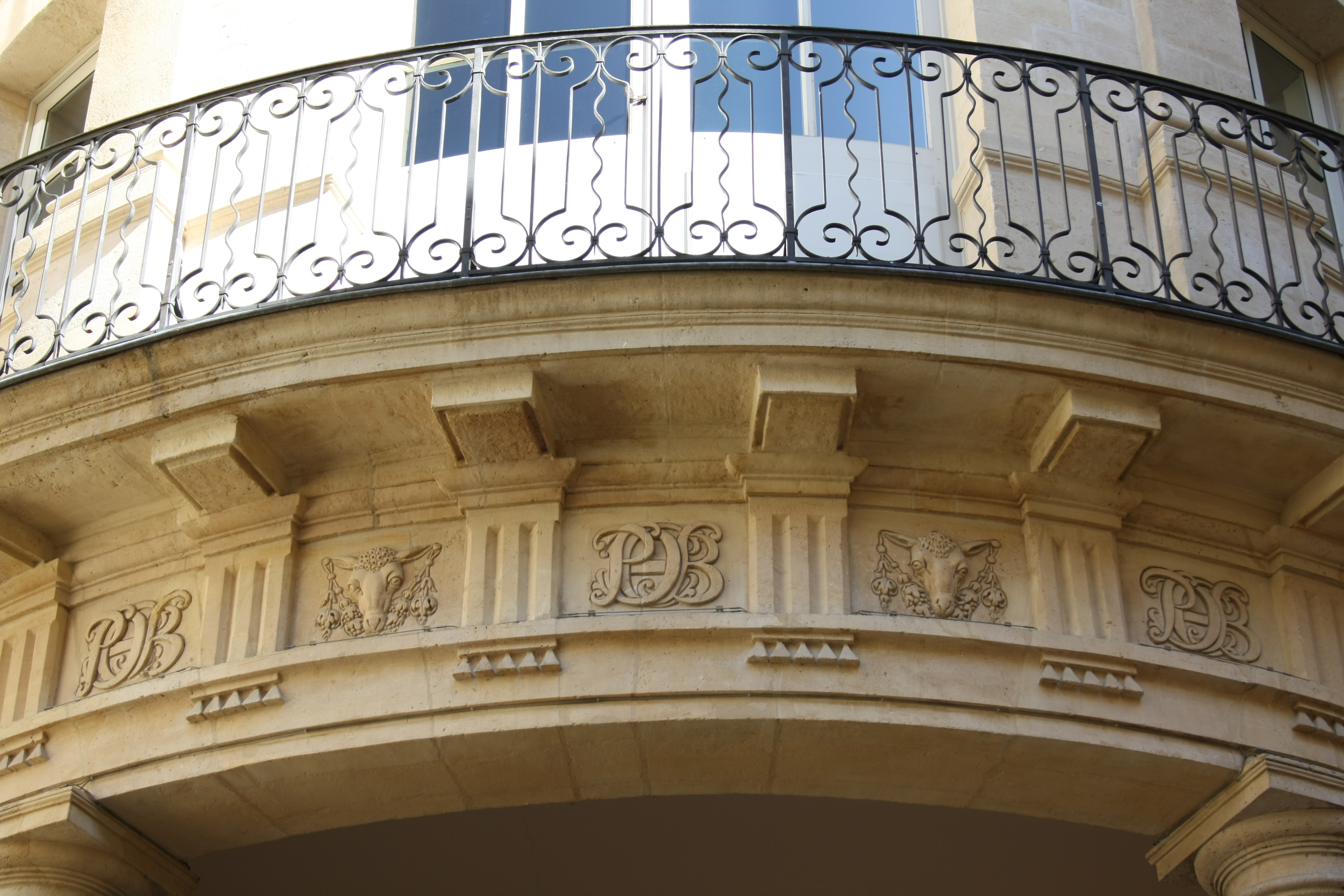
Doric frieze of the Hôtel de Beauvais from Paris

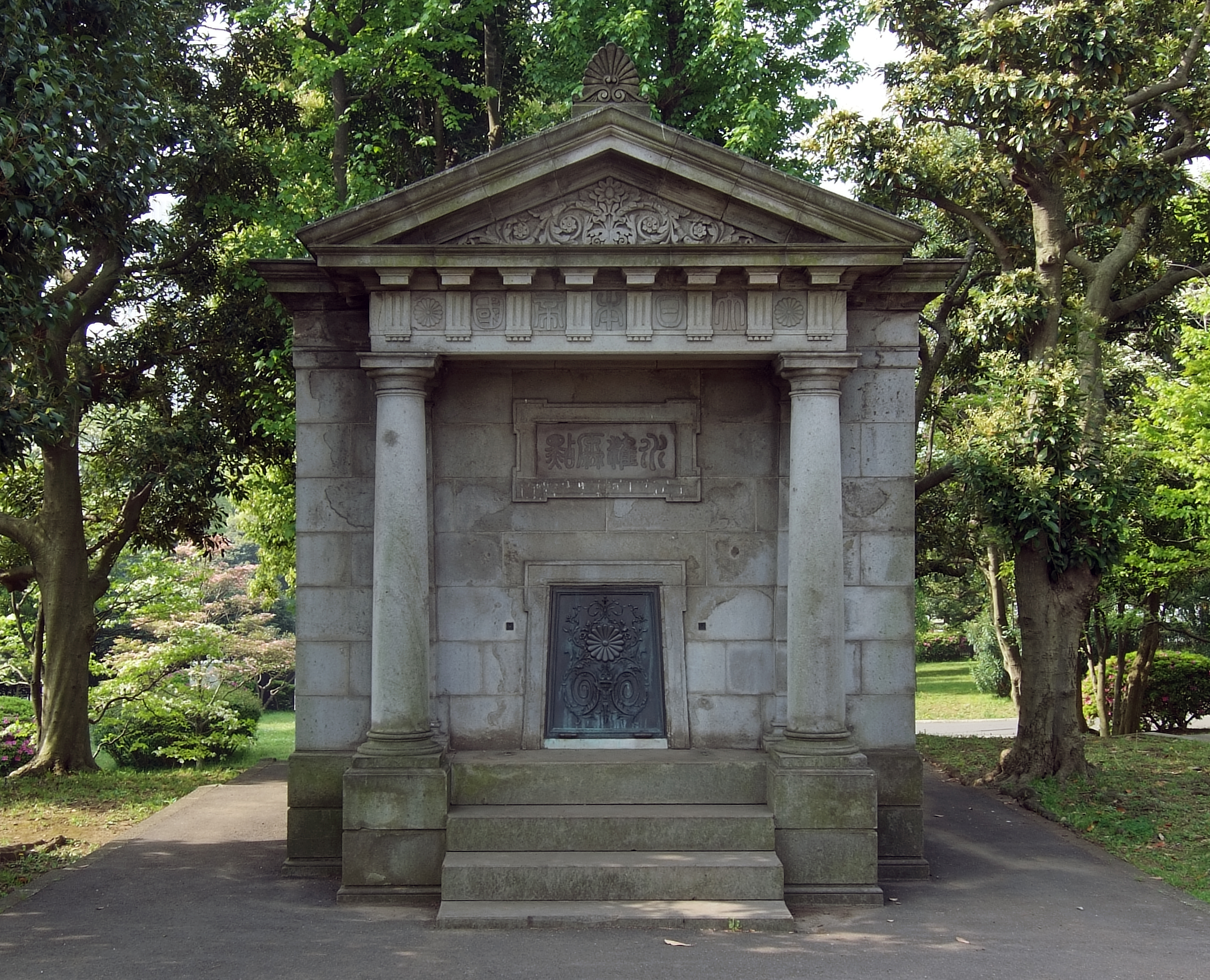
Melopes of the Japanese water height reference point storehouse in Tokyo, Japan with the inscription Dai Nihon Teikoku (大日本帝󠄁國, "Great Japanese Empire") and the Imperial crest

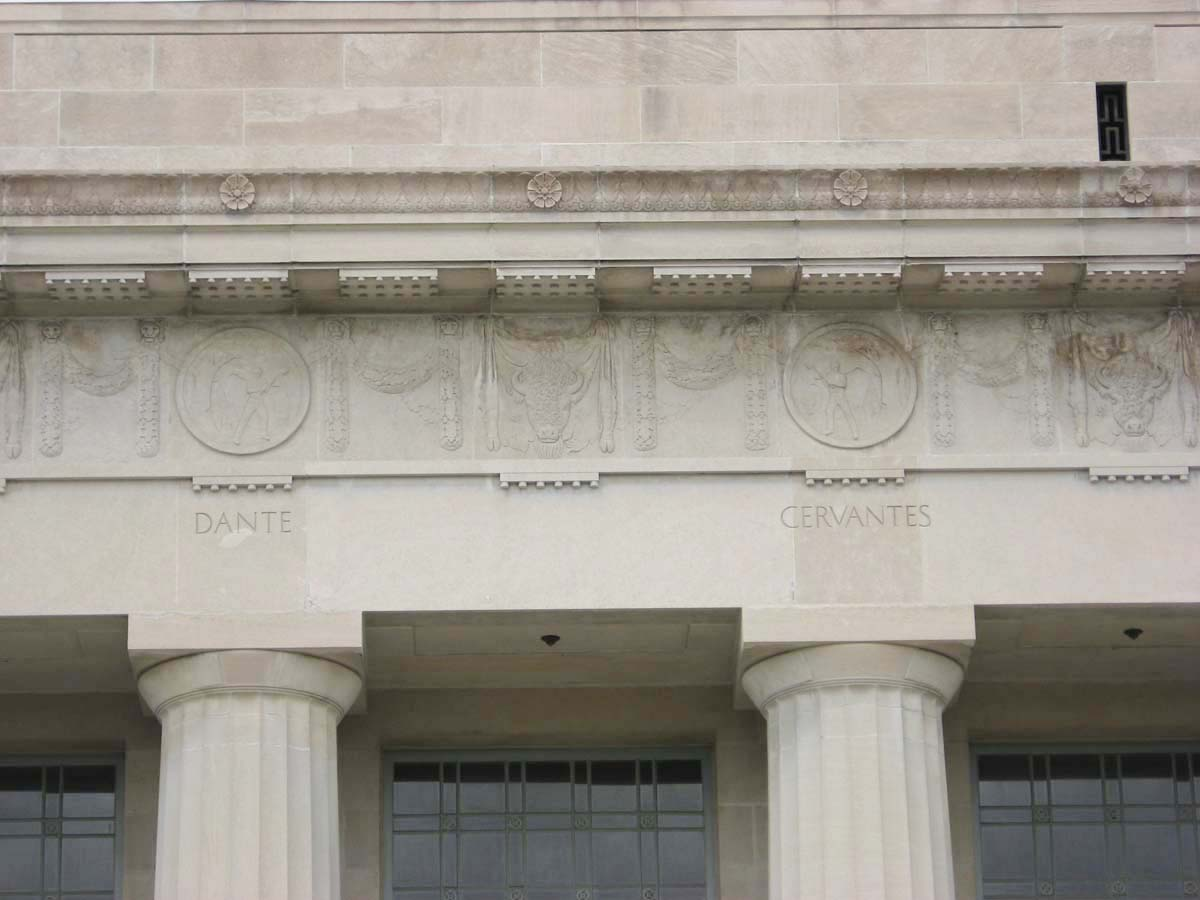
Early 20th-century Americanized metopes, using bison in place of cow skulls (bucranium)

== See also ==
- Classical order
