= Milagro (votive) =

Religious folk charms that are traditionally used for healing purposes

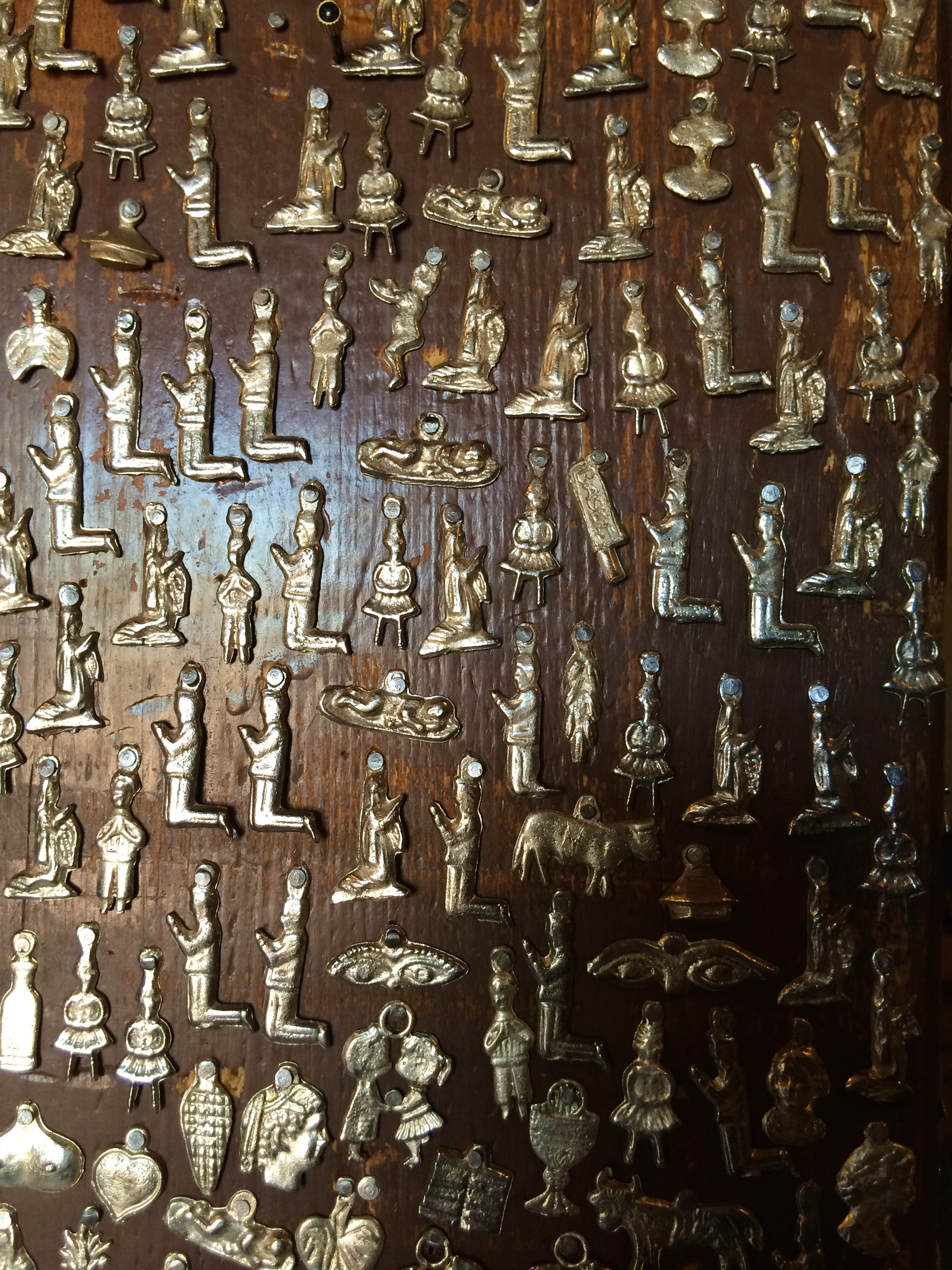
Milagros nailed to the church bell at San Miguel Mission of Santa Fe, New Mexico

The text that is painted beneath this ex-voto tells of the Gonzalez family, who were on the streets one night and were attacked. But, thanks to the Virgin of San Juan de los Lagos (whose image in the painting floats between the family and their assailants) they escaped unharmed. Our Lady of San Juan de los Lagos is venerated in the region of central Mexico where the depicted incident occurred. The ex-voto is dated August 28, 1947, San Juan de los Lagos.

Milagros (also known as an ex-voto or dijes or promesas) are religious folk charms that are traditionally used for healing purposes and as votive offerings in Mexico, the southern United States, other areas of Latin America, and parts of the Iberian Peninsula. They are frequently attached to altars, shrines, and sacred objects found in places of worship, and they are often purchased in churches and cathedrals, or from street vendors.

Milagros come in a variety of shapes and dimensions and are fabricated from many different materials, depending on local customs. For example, they might be nearly flat or fully three-dimensional; and they can be constructed from gold, silver, tin, lead, wood, bone, or wax. In Spanish, the word milagro literally means miracle or surprise.

== History ==
The use of milagros is a folk custom in parts of North, Central, and South America traceable to ancient Iberians who inhabited the coastal regions of Spain. The use of milagros accompanied the Spanish as they arrived in Central and South America. Although the custom is not as prevalent as it once was, the use of milagros or ex-votos continues to be a part of folk culture throughout rural areas of Spain—particularly Andalusia, Catalonia, and Majorca.

As part of a religious ritual or an act of devotion, milagros can be offered to a symbol of a saint as a reminder of a petitioner's particular need, or in gratitude for a prayer answered. They are used to assist in focusing attention towards a specific ailment, based on the type of charm used. Milagro symbolism is not universal. A milagro of a body part, such as a leg, might be used as part of a prayer or vow for the improvement of a leg, or it might refer to a concept such as travel. Similarly, a heart might represent ideas as diverse as a heart condition, a romance, or any number of other interpretations. Milagros are also carried for protection and good luck.

In addition to religious and ritual applications, milagros are often found as components in necklaces, earrings and other jewellery.

They correspond almost exactly to the tamata used in the Eastern Orthodox Churches.

== See also ==
- Folk medicine
- Retablo (Latin America)
- Tama (votive)
- Votive paintings of Mexico
