= Calamus =

Calamus may refer to:

== Biology ==
- Calamus (fish), a genus of fish in the family Sparidae
- Calamus (palm), a genus of rattan palms
- Calamus, the hollow shaft of a feather, also known as the quill
- Calamus scriptorius, a part of the rhomboid fossa
- Acorus calamus, the sweet flag, a tall wetland plant, commonly referred to as calamus in herbal medicine

== Place names ==
- Calamus, Iowa, United States
- Calamus, Wisconsin, United States
- Calamus Creek (disambiguation)
- Calamus Swamp, Ohio, United States

== Other uses ==
- Calamus, another name of fistula (liturgical object)
- Calamus (pen), an ancient reed-pen
- Calamus (DTP), a desktop publishing application
- Calamus (poems), a series of poems by American writer Walt Whitman
- Calamus Ensemble, a classical music ensemble featuring Roberto Carnevale
- Ensemble Cálamus, a classical music ensemble featuring Eduardo Paniagua
- USS Calamus (AOG-5) a Mettawee-class gasoline tanker acquired by the U.S. Navy
- Calamus or Kalamos, a figure in Greek mythology
- Calamus, a fictional character from surreal puzzle adventure video game OneShot

== See also ==
- Calamis (disambiguation)
