= Calamis =

Calamis (Ancient Greek: Κάλαμις) may refer to two sculptors of ancient Greece:

- Calamis (5th century BC)
- Calamis (4th century BC)

== See also ==
- Calamus (disambiguation)
