= Votive offering =

Object placed or left somewhere for religious purposes

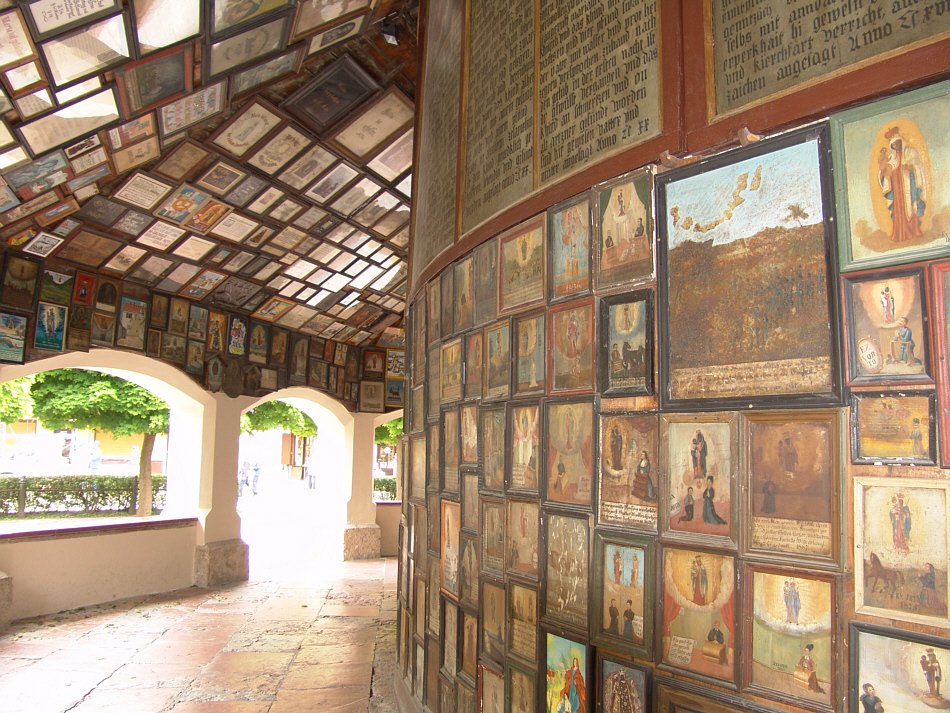
Votive paintings in the ambulatory of the Chapel of Grace, in Altötting, Bavaria, Germany

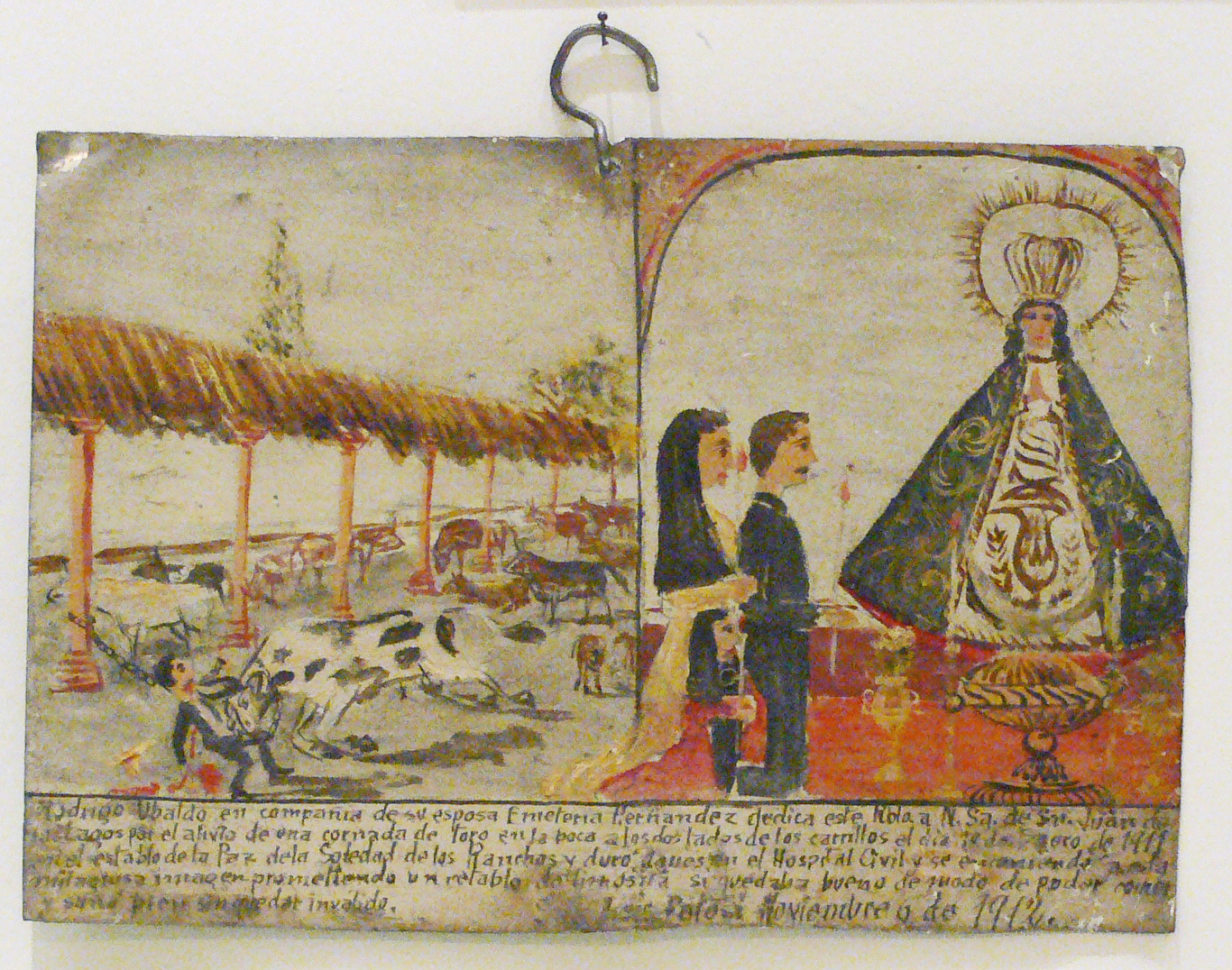
Mexican votive painting of 1911; the man survived an attack by a bull.

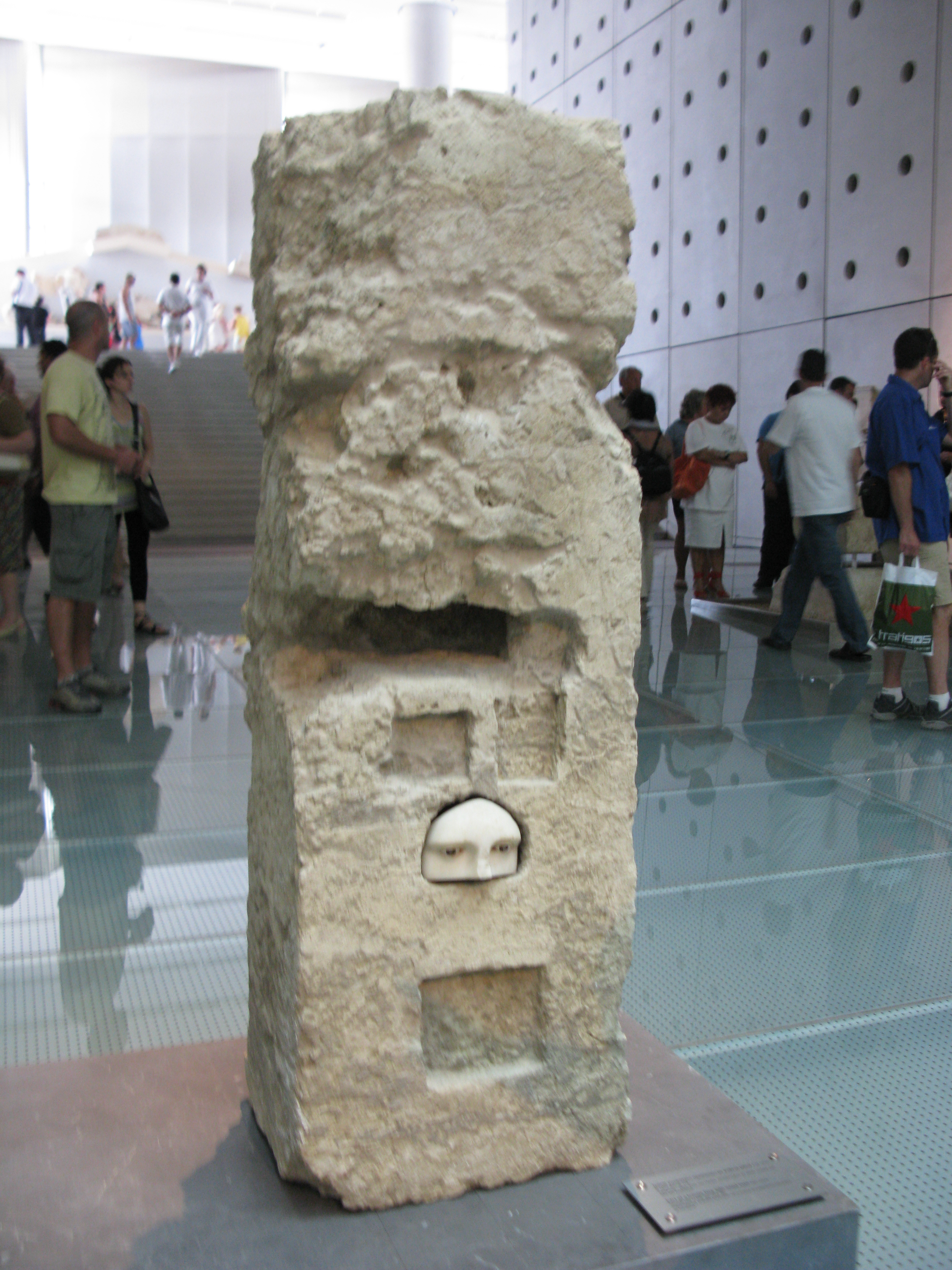
Part of a female face with inlaid eyes, Ancient Greek Votive offering, 4th century BC, probably by Praxias, set in a niche of a pillar in the sanctuary of Asclepios in Athens, Acropolis Museum, Athens

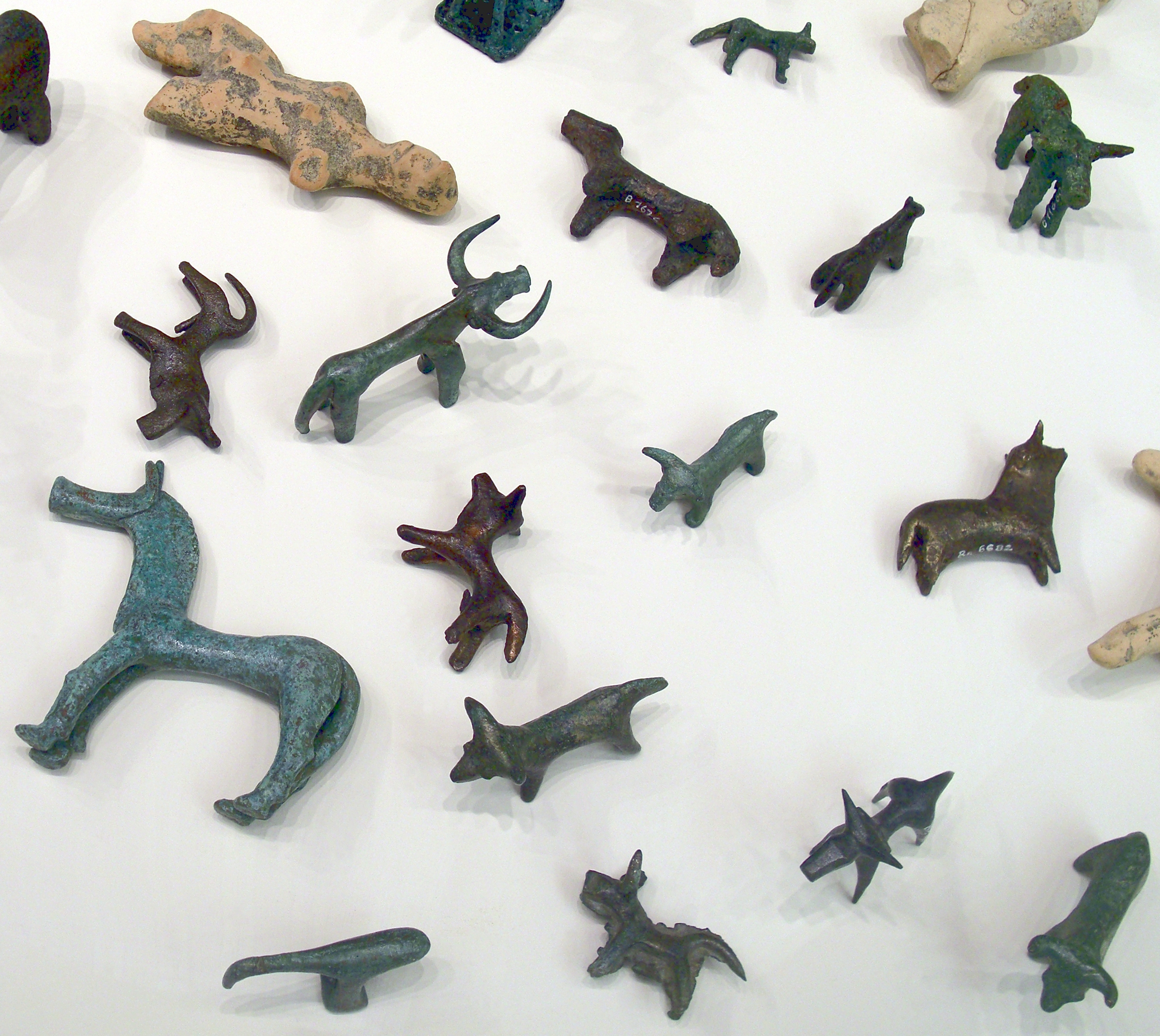
Bronze animal statuettes from Olympia, votive offerings, 8th–7th century BC

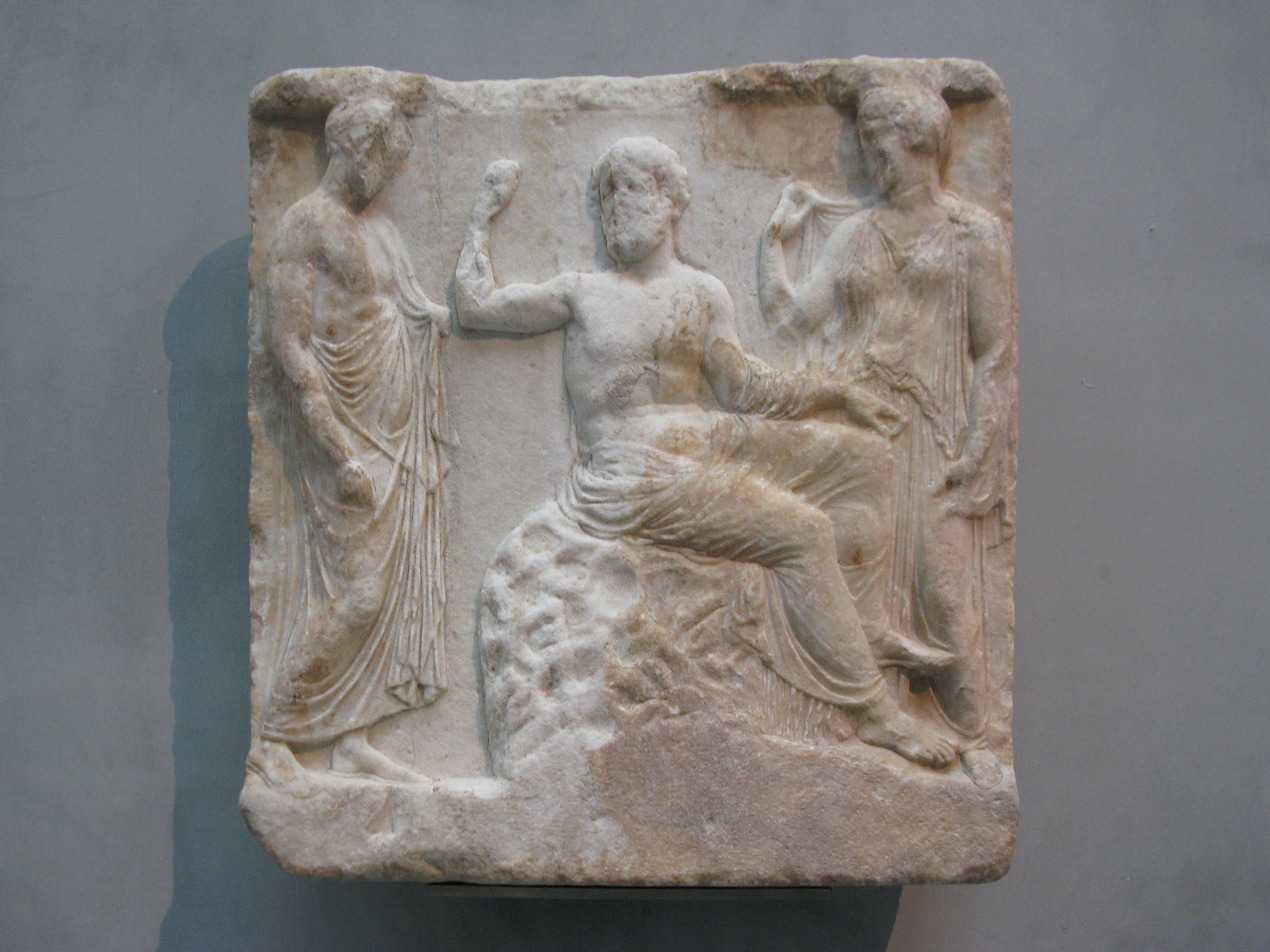
Ancient greek votive relief. 400 BC. Asclepios is sitting on an omphalos between his wife Epione and a man clad in himation. New Acropolis Museum, Athens, Greece.

A votive offering or votive deposit is one or more objects displayed or deposited, without the intention of recovery or use, in a sacred place for religious purposes. Such items are a feature of modern and ancient societies and are generally made to gain favor with supernatural forces.

While some offerings were apparently made in anticipation of the achievement of a particular wish, in Western cultures from which documentary evidence survives it was more typical to wait until the wish had been fulfilled before making the offering, for which the more specific term ex-voto may be used. Other offerings were very likely regarded just as gifts to the deity, not linked to any particular need.

In Buddhism, votive offering such as construction of stupas was a prevalent practice in Ancient India, an example of which can be observed in the ruins of the ancient Vikramshila University and other contemporary structures. Votive offerings have been described in historical Roman era and Greek sources, although similar acts continue into the present day—for example, in traditional Catholic culture and, arguably, in the modern-day practice of tossing coins into a wishing well or fountain. The modern construction practice of topping out can be considered an example of a votive practice with ancient roots.

In archaeology, votive deposits differ from hoards; although they may contain similar items, votive deposits were not intended to be recovered.

== Ancient offerings ==
In Europe, votive deposits are known from as early as the Neolithic, with polished axe hoards, reaching a peak in the late Bronze Age. High status artifacts such as armor and weaponry (mostly shields, swords, spears and arrows), fertility and cult symbols, coins, various treasures and animal statuettes (often dogs, oxen and in later periods horses) were common offerings in antiquity.

The votive offerings were sacrificed and buried or more commonly cast into bodies of water or peat bogs, whence they could not possibly have been recovered. In certain cases entire ships have been sacrificed, as in the Danish bog Nydam Mose. Often all the objects in a ritual hoard are broken, possibly 'killing' the objects to put them even further beyond utilitarian use before deposition. The purposeful discarding of valuable items such as swords and spearheads is thought to have had ritual overtones. The items have since been discovered in rivers, lakes and present or former wetlands by construction workers, peat diggers, metal-detectorists, members of the public and archaeologists.

A saying by Diogenes of Sinope as quoted by Diogenes Laërtius, indicates the high level of votive offering in Ancient Greece:

When some one expressed astonishment at the votive offerings in Samothrace, his (Diogenes) comment was,
'There would have been far more, if those who were not saved had set up offerings.'

The Treasuries at Olympia and Delphi (including the Athenian Treasury and Siphnian Treasury) were buildings by the various Greek city-states to hold their own votive offerings in money and precious metal. The sites also contained large quantities of votive sculptures, although these were clearly intended to glorify each city in view of its rivals as well as to give thanks to the gods. Votive offerings were also used as atonement for sins committed against a god or goddess. The offerings were in certain cases created by a separate person due to the gifter having an injury or other circumstances, which was allowed.

Some Greek offerings, such as bronze tripods at Delphi, were apparently displayed for a period and then buried in groups. At Olympia many small figurines, mostly of animals, were thrown onto the huge pile of ashes from animal sacrifices at the altar outside the Temple of Zeus. Much knowledge of ancient Greek art in base metal comes from these and other excavated deposits of offerings. Arms and armour, especially helmets, were also given after a victory.

In Mesoamerica, votive deposits have been recovered from the Olmec site of El Manati (dated to 1600–1200 BC) and the Maya Sacred Cenote at Chichen Itza (850–1550 AD).

Archaeologists have recovered some votive offerings in ancient Sparta from the 5th century BC. These votive offerings give evidence to the presence of literacy in Spartan culture. Placing greater emphasis on inscriptions which seem to have been made by the individual making the offering, archaeologists can interpret that, of the early dedicators, there were very few in number and that most, if not all, were from the upper classes. One piece of pottery was found that may have had measurement signs on it. This would indicate an everyday literacy among the Spartans if this is true. Unfortunately, scholars have not recovered any other piece of pottery with a similar inscription to support that single find.

The 13 Ancient Votive Stones of Pesaro were unearthed in 1737 on a local Pesaro farm in the Province of Pesaro e Urbino, Italy, and date to pre-Etruscan times. They are inscribed with the names of various Roman gods such as APOLLO, MAT[ER]-MATVTA, SALVS, FIDE, and IVNONII (Juno).

=== Curse tablets ===
A curse tablet or defixio is a small sheet of tin or lead on which a message wishing misfortune upon someone else was inscribed. Usually found rolled up and deliberately deposited, there are five main reasons for dedicating a curse tablet: Litigation, Competition, Trade, Erotic Ambition, or Theft.

Of those in Britain the vast majority relate to theft. The two largest concentrations are from the sacred springs at Aquae Sulis, where 130 examples are recorded, and at Uley, where over 140 examples are visible. The use of the curse-tablet in seeking restoration of stolen property is strong evidence of invoking divine power through a non-traditional religious ceremony, often involving some form of water-deposition. The usual form of divine invocation was through prayer, sacrifice and altar dedication so access to this information provides useful insights into Roman provincial culture.

=== Threats ===
Many unrecovered ancient votive offerings are threatened in today's world, especially those submerged in wetlands or other bodies of water. Wetlands and other aquatic sites often protect and preserve materials for thousands of years, because of their natural occurring anaerobic environments. However, many seabeds have been disturbed, rivers and streams have been stretched out or re-routed in the landscape, and many wetlands have been fully or partially drained or landfilled for various reasons in the last 100–200 years. Therefore, many remaining objects are in danger of oxidation and eventual rapid deterioration. The leading causes of the disturbances are dredging, bottom trawling fishing boats, agricultural activities, peat cutting, groundwater extraction by water wells and establishments of larger infrastructural facilities like expressways, water treatment plants, and in some instances, large-scale nature re-establishment projects.

== Judaism ==
The Torah makes provision for "free-will offerings" which may be made by any individual. These are different from votive offerings which are linked to a vow. cf Leviticus 22.23 where the Hebrew root letters for a freewill offering are נדב (nadab), but for a votive offering are נדר (nadar). In this verse a clear differentiation is made between the two. See Strongs numbers H5068 where the Hitpael is to volunteer, or make a free will offering and H5087 where the Qal is to vow a vow.

When Solomon built the first temple he provided a number of furnishings above and beyond what had been commanded to Moses on Mount Sinai (see Temple of Solomon).

Oral tradition in Rabbinic Judaism also speaks of a huge golden grape vine artifact outside of the holy site of the Temple in Jerusalem before its destruction by the Romans.

== Christianity ==
The tradition of votive offerings has been carried into Christianity in both the East and the West. The particular type of the votive crown, originally Byzantine, was also adopted in the West.

=== Eastern Christianity ===
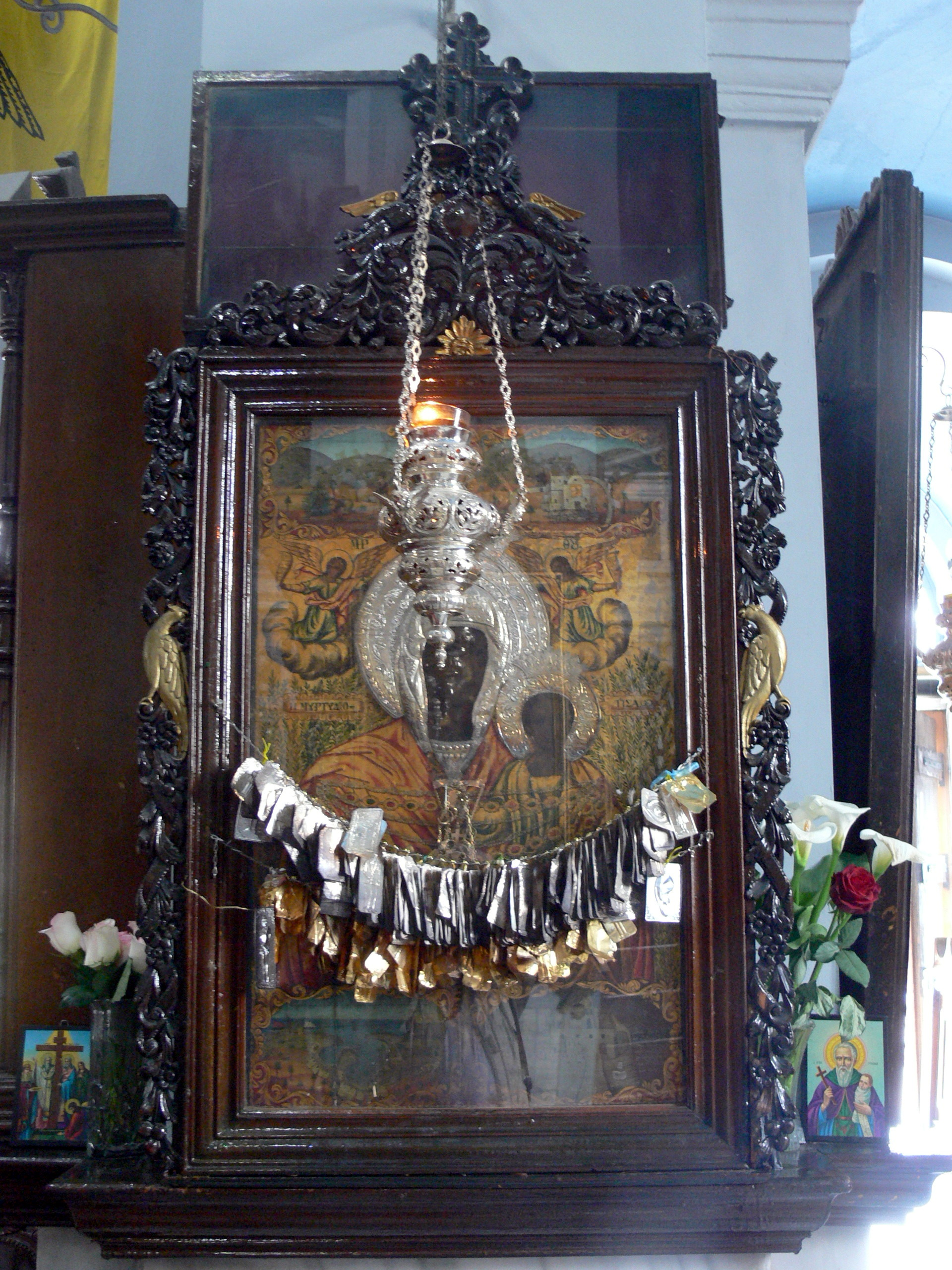
Tamata (votive offerings) left in front of an icon of the Black Madonna in Chania, Crete

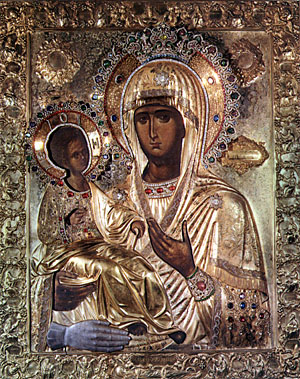
Wonderworking icon of the Theotokos, "The Three-handed" (Trojeručica); the third hand in silver is a votive offering in thanksgiving for a miracle. From Hilandar monastery, 8th–14th century.

According to Sacred Tradition, after Constantine the Great's conversion and subsequent victory at the Battle of the Milvian Bridge, he donated one of the crosses he carried in battle to the Church. This cross is reputed to be preserved on Mount Athos.

One of the most famous Orthodox votive offerings is that by Saint John of Damascus. According to tradition, while he was serving as Vizier to Caliph Al-Walid I, he was falsely accused of treachery and his hand was cut off. Upon praying in front of an icon of the Theotokos his hand was miraculously restored. In thanksgiving, he had a silver replica of his hand fashioned and attached it to the icon (see image at right). This icon, now called "Trojeručica" (The Three-handed) is preserved at Hilandar Monastery on Mount Athos.

Orthodox Christians continue to make votive offerings to this day, often in the form of tamata, metal plaques symbolizing the subject of their prayers. Other offerings include candles, prosphora, wine, oil, or incense. In addition, many will leave something of personal value, such as jewelry, a pectoral cross or military decoration as a sign of devotion.

=== Western Christianity ===
==== Roman Catholicism ====
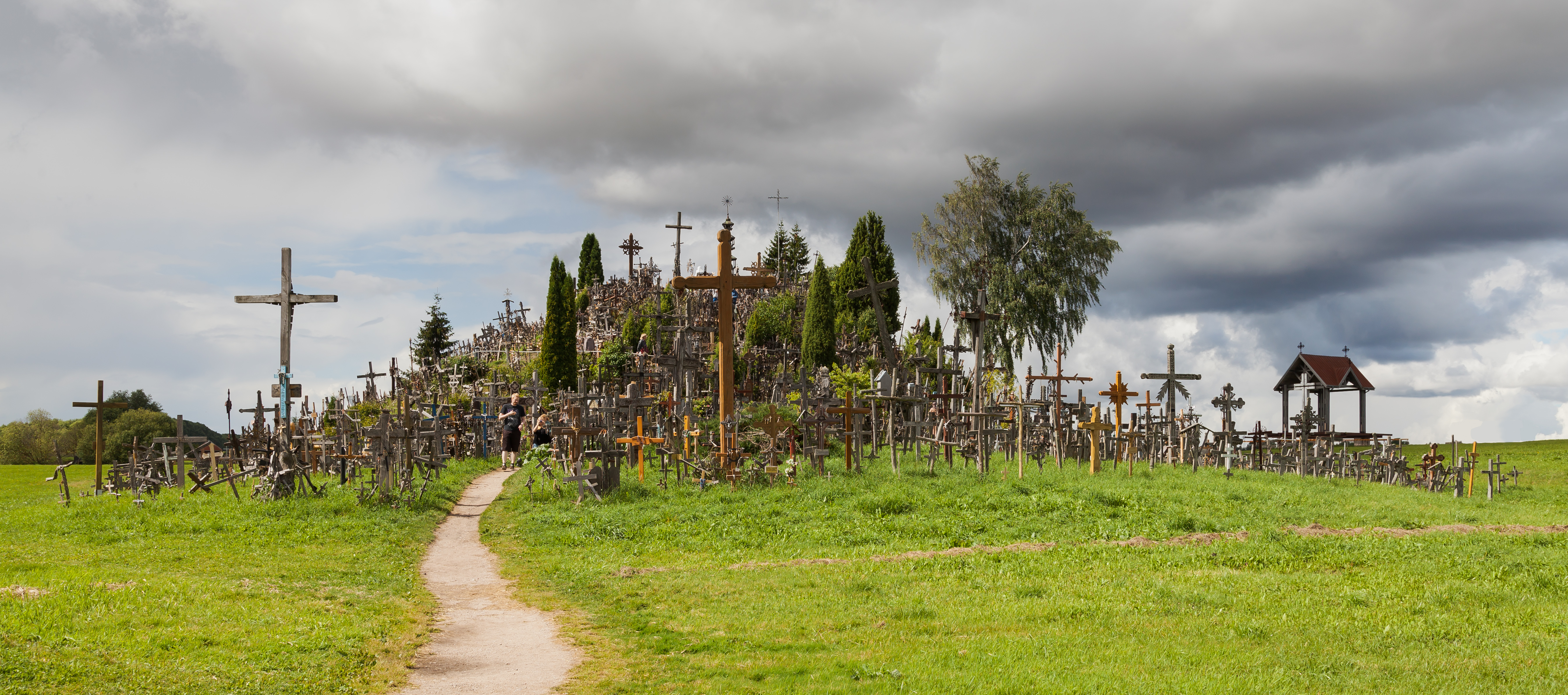
Hill of Crosses, Lithuania

In the Roman Catholic Church, offerings were made either to fulfill a vow made to God for deliverance, or a thing left to a Church in gratitude for some favor that was granted. Today, votives can be lit votive candles, offered flowers, statues, vestments and monetary donations. Traditional special forms of votive offering ex votos include small silver models of the afflicted part of the body, inscribed stone tablets, folk art paintings of an incident of danger such as the votive paintings of Mexico and model ships donated by sailors who have survived a dangerous voyage. In the Spanish-speaking world a milagro is a small metal offering, equivalent to the Orthodox tamata.

Many Catholic churches still have areas where such offerings are displayed. Notre-Dame-des-Victoires, Paris, displays over 10,000, with a military specialization and including many military decorations given by their recipients. The Votive Church, Vienna is a late example of many churches which are themselves votive offerings, in this case built to give thanks for a narrow escape from assassination by Emperor Franz Joseph I of Austria in 1853.

Medieval examples include:

- Several votive crowns, such as those in the Treasure of Guarrazar
- Probably the Iron Crown of Lombardy
- Henry III of England had a golden statue of his queen made and placed on the shrine of St. Edward at Westminster
- A falcon in wax at the shrine of Saint Wulstan by Edward I
- A diamond and a ruby, adorning the tomb of St. Thomas Becket at Canterbury
- Numerous crutches, left in the grotto at Lourdes
- The song "O Wilhelme, pastor bone" composed by John Taverner is a Votive Antiphon dedicated to Cardinal Wolsey

Especially in the Latin world, there is a tradition of votive paintings, typically depicting a dangerous incident which the offeror survived. The votive paintings of Mexico are paralleled in other countries. In Italy, where more than 15,000 ex-voto paintings are thought to survive from before 1600, these began to appear in the 1490s, probably modelled on the small predella panels below altarpieces. These are a form of folk art, typically painted on tin plates salvaged from packaging. Other examples may be large and grand paintings, such as Titian's Jacopo Pesaro being presented by Pope Alexander VI to Saint Peter, given in thanks for a naval victory.

==== Lutheranism ====
The practice of votive offerings in Lutheran Churches, such as the Church of Sweden, continued after the Reformation.

== Buddhism ==
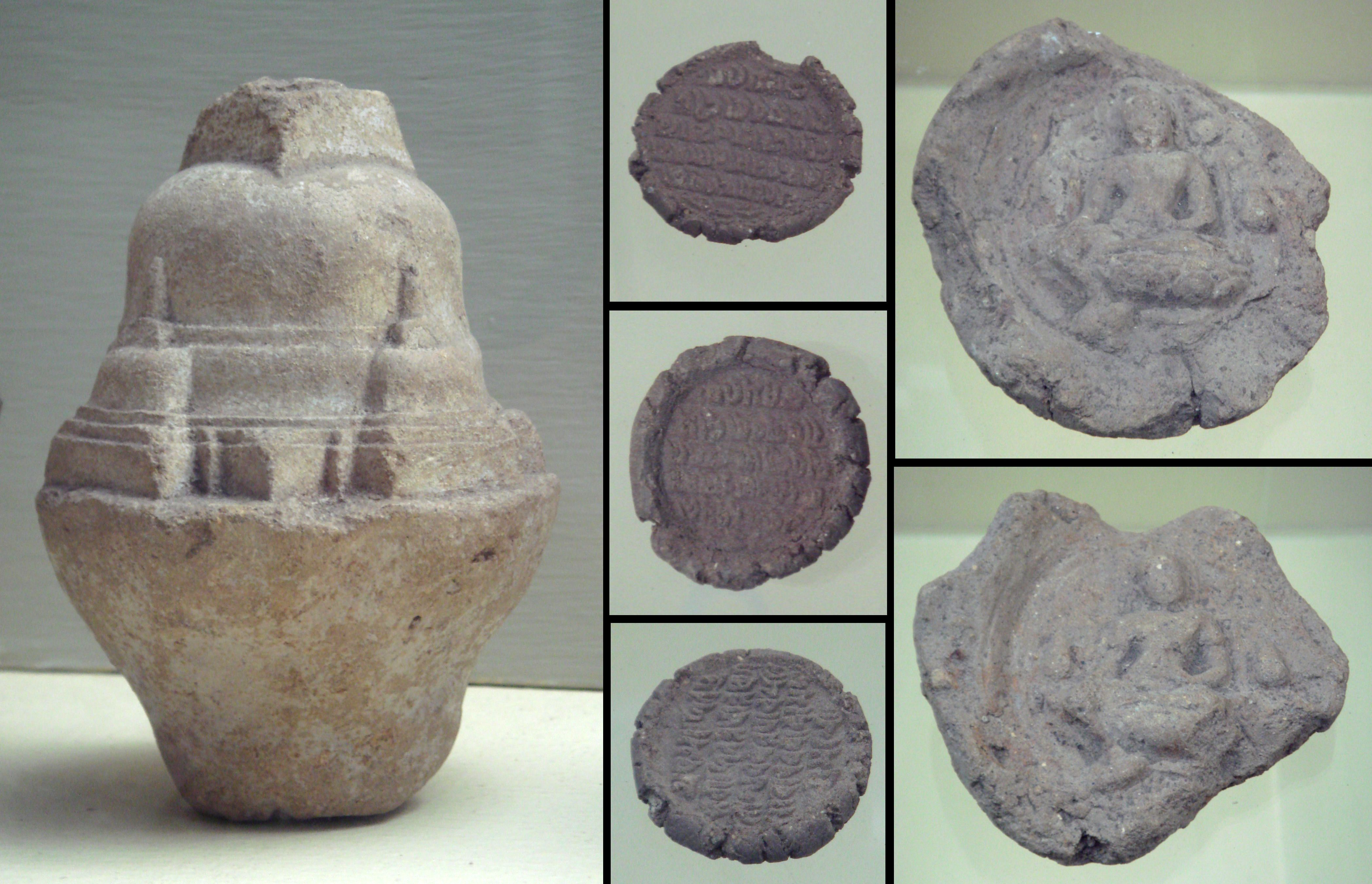
Stupika which contains Buddhist votive tablets, 8th-century Bali

In Buddhism, votive offerings usually take the form of a small clay or terracotta tablet bearing Buddhist images, usually Buddharupa and contain text. These tablets are left in sacred Buddhist sites by devotees as an offering during their pilgrimage. An example are Buddhist Tibetan votive tablets made for a pilgrimage to Bodhgaya. Votive tablets served both as meritorious offerings and as souvenirs. Most were made of clay, while a more rare and expensive tablet was made from metal. Historically, votive tablets can be found in Asian Buddhist lands, from Japan, India, Sri Lanka, Myanmar, Thailand, Cambodia, China, Indonesia and Malaysia. In Thailand, votive tablets are known as Thai Buddha amulets, a kind of Thai Buddhist blessed item used to raise temple funds by producing the amulets.

== Jainism ==
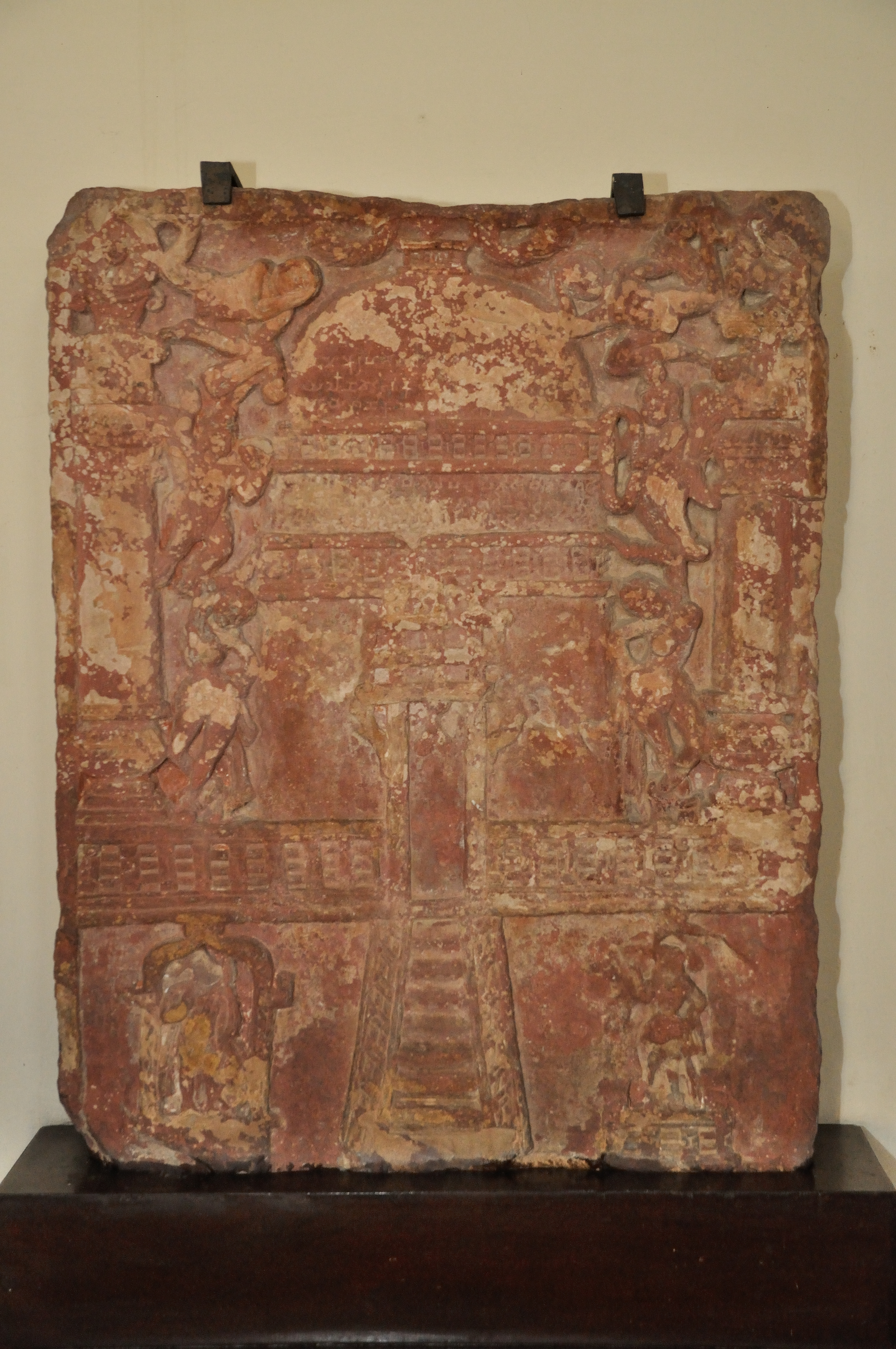
Vasu Śilāpaṭa Ayagapatta, c. 1st century, excavated from Kankali Tila

Ayagapata is a type of votive slab associated with worship in Jainism. Numerous such stone tablets were discovered during excavations at ancient Jain sites like Kankali Tila near Mathura in India. Some of them date back to the 1st century. These slabs are decorated with objects and designs central to Jain worship such as the stupa, dharmacakra and triratna.

A large number of ayagapata (tablet of homage) votive tablets for offerings and the worship of tirthankara were found at Mathura.

These stone tablets bear a resemblance to the earlier Shilapatas, stone tablets that were placed under trees to worship Yakshas. However, this was done by indigenous folk communities before Jainism originated, suggesting that both have commonalities in rituals. A scholar on Jain art wrote about an Ayagapata discovered around Kankali Tila: "The technical name of such a tablet was Ayagapata meaning homage panel."

== See also ==
- Anathema
- Devotional articles
- Favissa
- Fire worship
- Grave goods
- Libation
- Pinax
- Propitiation
- Ralaghan Man
- Senjafuda
- Sin offering
- Tell Asmar Hoard
- Votive candle
- Wassailing
