= Tama (votive) =

Offering item in Eastern Orthodoxy

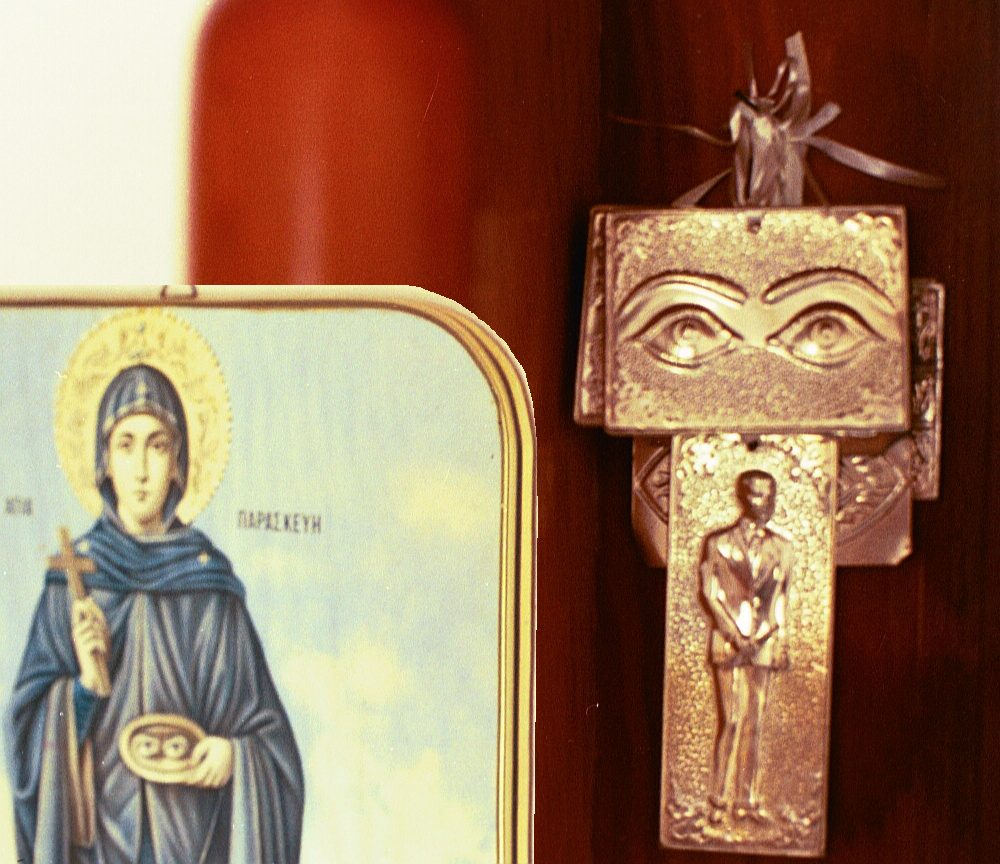
An icon of Saint Paraskeva with tamata hung beside it. Crete, 2001. The saint holds a plate with two eyeballs on it. She is considered to be a healer of the blind. One of her visitors has left a votive offering (tama) depicting eyes to indicate what her affliction is.

A tama (Greek: τάμα, pl. τάματα, tamata) is a form of votive offering or ex-voto used in the Eastern Orthodox Church, particularly the Greek Orthodox Church. Tamata are usually small metal plaques, which may be of base or precious metal, usually with an embossed image symbolizing the subject of prayer for which the plaque is offered.

== Ceremony and symbolism ==
Tamata may be offered to an icon or shrine of a saint as a reminder of a petitioner's particular need, or in gratitude for a prayer answered.

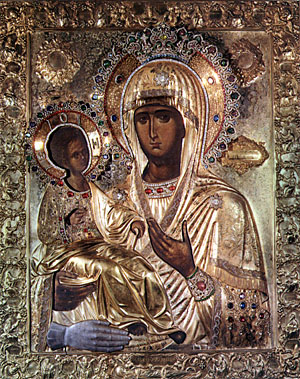
A wonderworking icon of the Theotokos, "The Three-handed" (Trojeručica), the third hand in silver is a votive offering in thanksgiving for a miracle.

A wide variety of images may be found on tamata, with the images capable of multiple interpretations. A heart may symbolize a prayer for love or a heart problem. Eyes may indicate an eye affliction, hands or legs may indicate maladies of the limbs, a pair of wedding crowns may mean a prayer for a happy marriage, a torso for afflictions of the body, and so forth.

Tamata may be bought in shops selling Greek Orthodox religious items, and then hung with a ribbon on a pole or hooks near an icon or shrine of a saint, the act of which is usually accompanied with a prayer, and sometimes with the lighting of a votive candle. The destinations of pilgrimages often include shrines decorated with many tamata.

One of the most famous Orthodox votive offerings is that by John of Damascus. According to tradition, while he was serving as Vizier to the Caliph, he was falsely accused of treachery and his hand was cut off. Upon praying in front of an icon of the Theotokos his hand was miraculously restored. In thanksgiving, he had a silver replica of his hand fashioned and attached it to the icon. This icon, now called "Trojeručica" (The Three-handed) is preserved at Hilandar Monastery on Mount Athos.

Tamata is also found in Italy, particularly in the South. It may be compared to many forms of Roman Catholic votive offerings, such as the Milagros traditionally used for healing purposes and as votive offerings in the Roman Catholic cultures of Mexico, the southern United States, Latin America, and parts of the Iberian Peninsula.

== See also ==
- Paraklesis
- Patron saint
