= Trojeručica =

Eastern Orthodox wonderworking icon

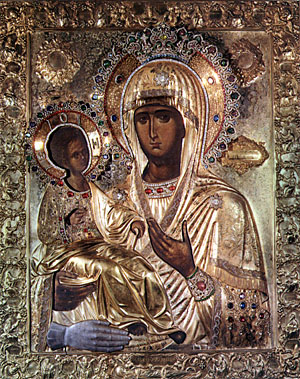
- The "third" hand, made of argent, in the bottom left corner, original icon from the Hilandar Monastery
- Artist: St John Damascene
- Type: Eastern Orthodox icon
- Location: Hilandar

Bogorodica Trojeručica (Serbian Cyrillic: Богородица Тројеручица, Greek: Παναγία Τριχερούσα, Panagia Tricherousa, meaning "Three-handed Theotokos") or simply Trojeručica (Тројеручица, Three-handed) is an Eastern Orthodox wonderworking icon believed to have been produced in the 8th century in Palestine by John of Damascus. It depicts Theotokos (Virgin Mary) with young Jesus in the hodegetria position, and is covered with a riza. On the back of the icon is the painting of Saint Nicholas. It is being kept at the Hilandar Monastery on Mount Athos, Greece, and is considered the most important icon of the Serbian Orthodox Church.

== History ==
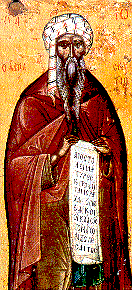
John of Damascus

According to tradition, the icon was in the possession of John of Damascus in the early 8th century and it is associated with his miraculous healing around the year 717. According to tradition, while he was serving as Vizier to caliph Al-Walid I, he was falsely accused of treachery and his hand was cut off. The accusation was made by Byzantine Iconoclast emperor Leo the Isaurian, an opponent of St John and friend of Al-Walid I. According to tradition, upon praying in front of an icon of the Theotokos his hand was miraculously restored. In thanksgiving, he had a silver replica of his hand fashioned and attached it to the icon. After this, the icon became known as "three-handed" (Tricherousa), because it had three hands (two of the Theotokos plus one more).

John Damascene became a monk at Mar Sabbas monastery outside of Jerusalem and gave the icon to the monastic community there. Later the icon was given as a present to St. Sava when he visited the monastery, together with another icon of the Theotokos in the style of Nursing Madonna, and with the crosier of Sabbas the Sanctified, the founder of the monastery. Sava brought the icon to Hilandar monastery where he lived. It remained there until 1347 when it was taken by Dušan of Serbia during his visit to Hilandar and brought with him to Serbia. At the end of the 14th century, the icon was in the possession of the Studenica monastery. In the early 15th century, Trojeručica was back in Hilandar.

Until very recently the icon was formally the abbot of Hilandar, with monks elected to serve as its deputy. This icon has two feast days: June 28 [O.S. July 11] and July 12 [O.S. July 25].

Art historians think the style of the icon is more likely from the 14th century, and that it may be a copy or re-painting of an earlier prototype. Another version brought to Moscow in 1661 became famous, and resulted in many Russian copies.

== Replicas ==
There are numerous replicas of the icon as per the gallery section. These also include at Lazarica in Bournville which has housed its own replica since 2019 and which is dedicated to families of bereaved children.

== Gallery ==
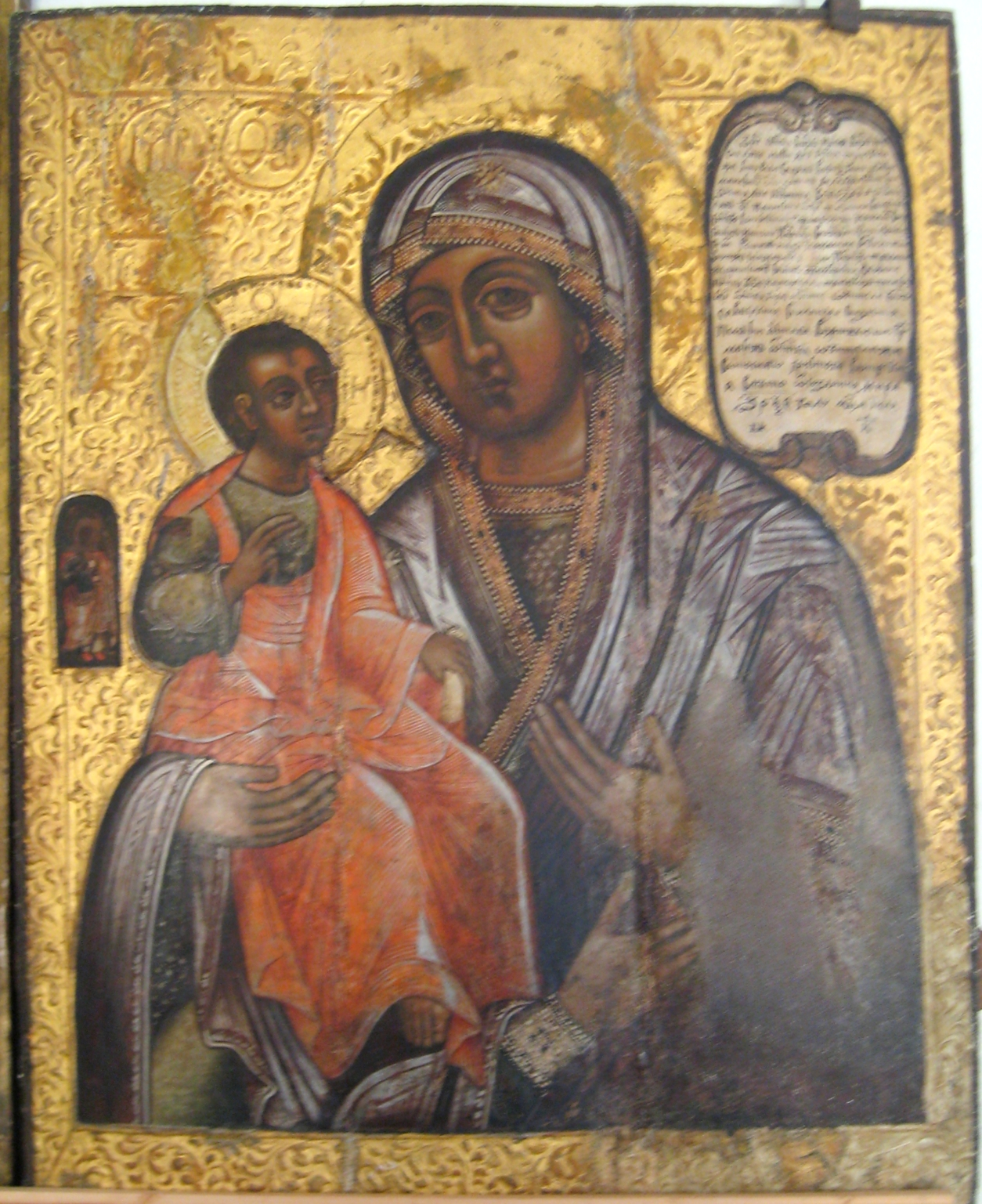
Trojeručica copy, 19 century, Ferapontov Monastery, Vologda region, Russia

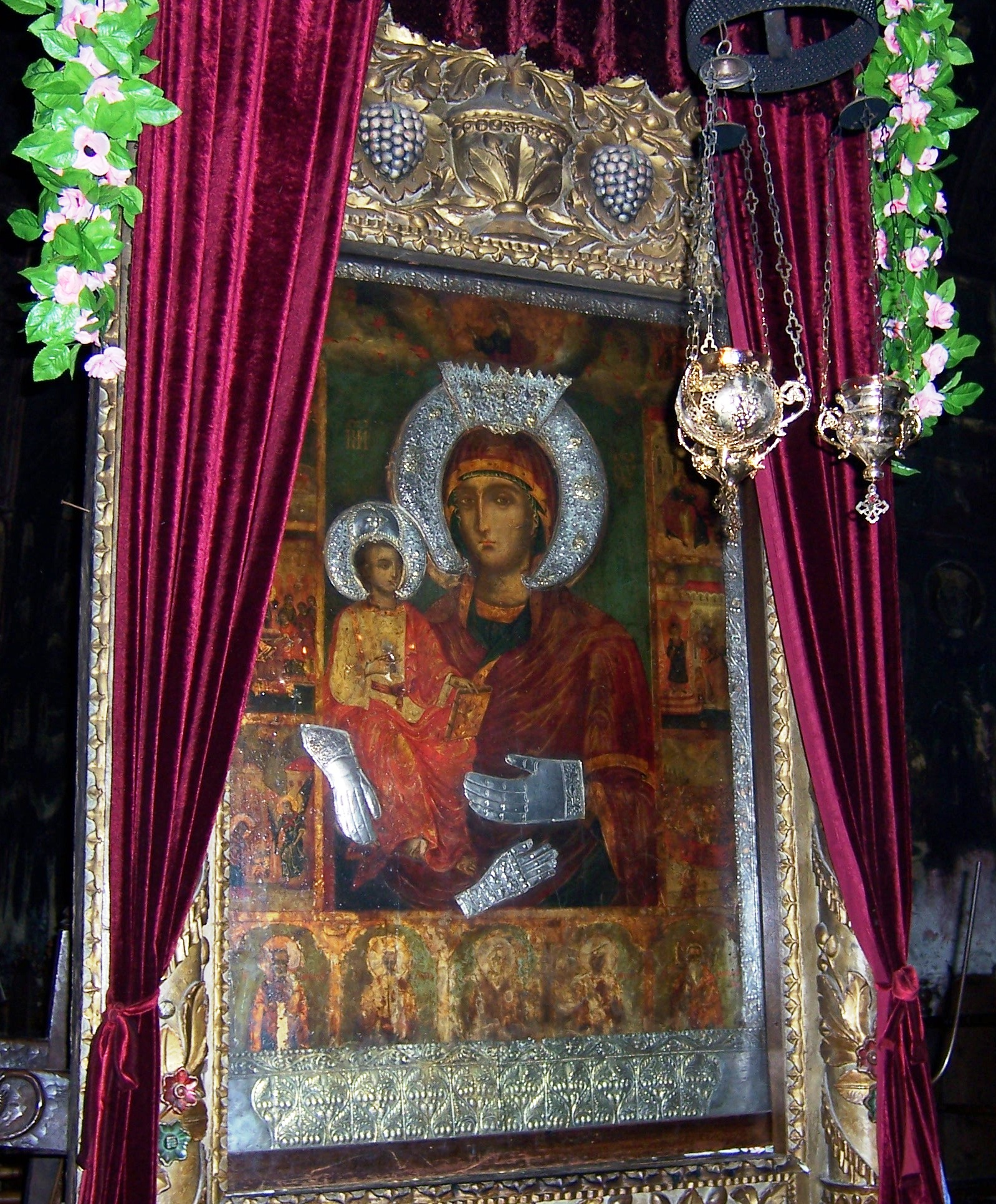
Trojeručica copy, Troyan Monastery, Bulgaria

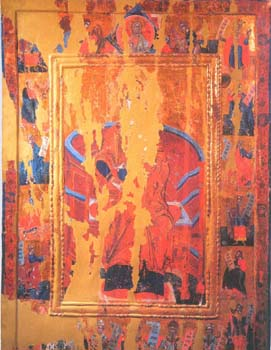
Trojeručica, Lesnovo monastery, North Macedonia

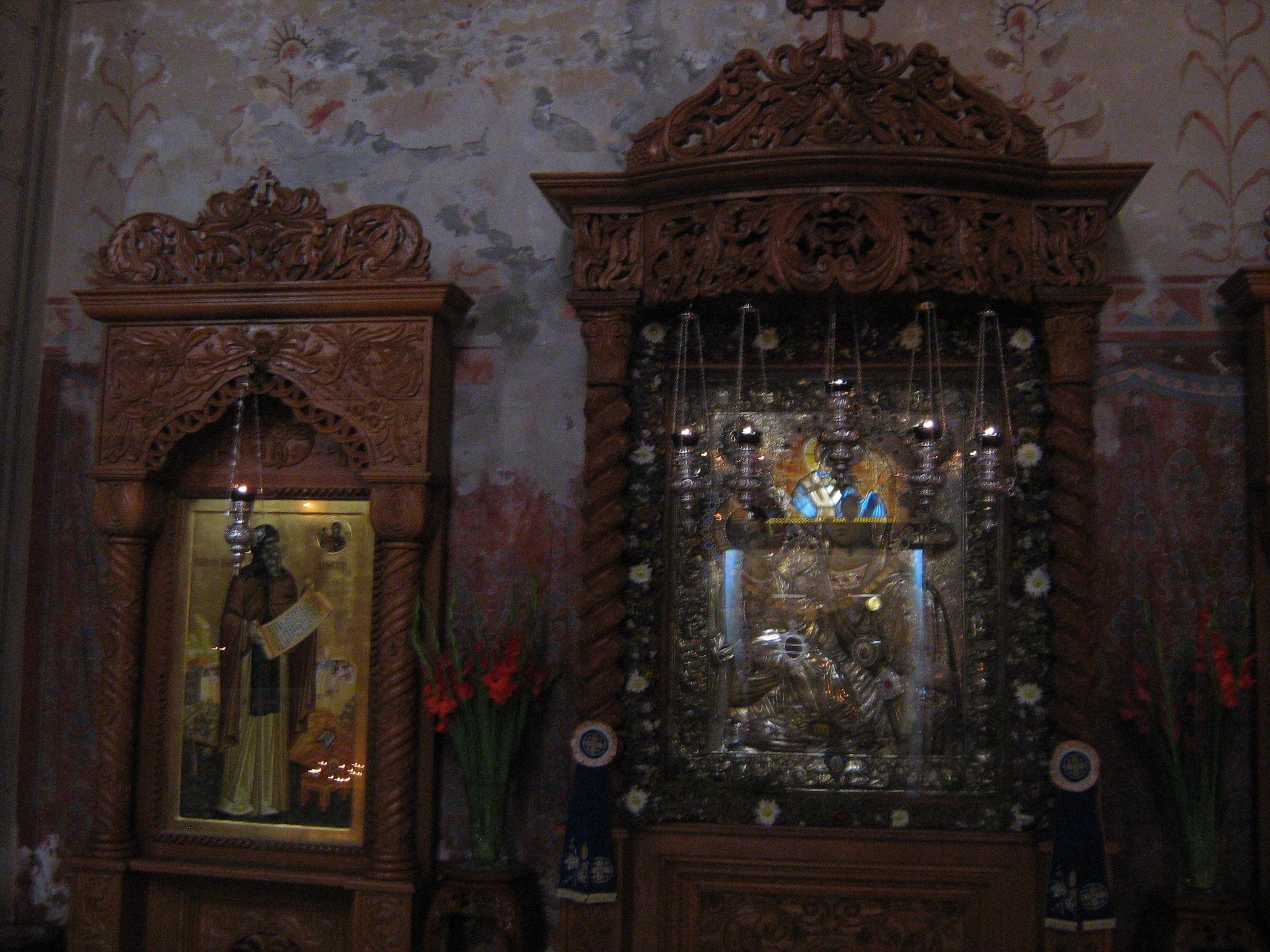
The third made copy of the original icon from the Hilandar, Grgeteg Monastery, Vojvodina province, Serbia

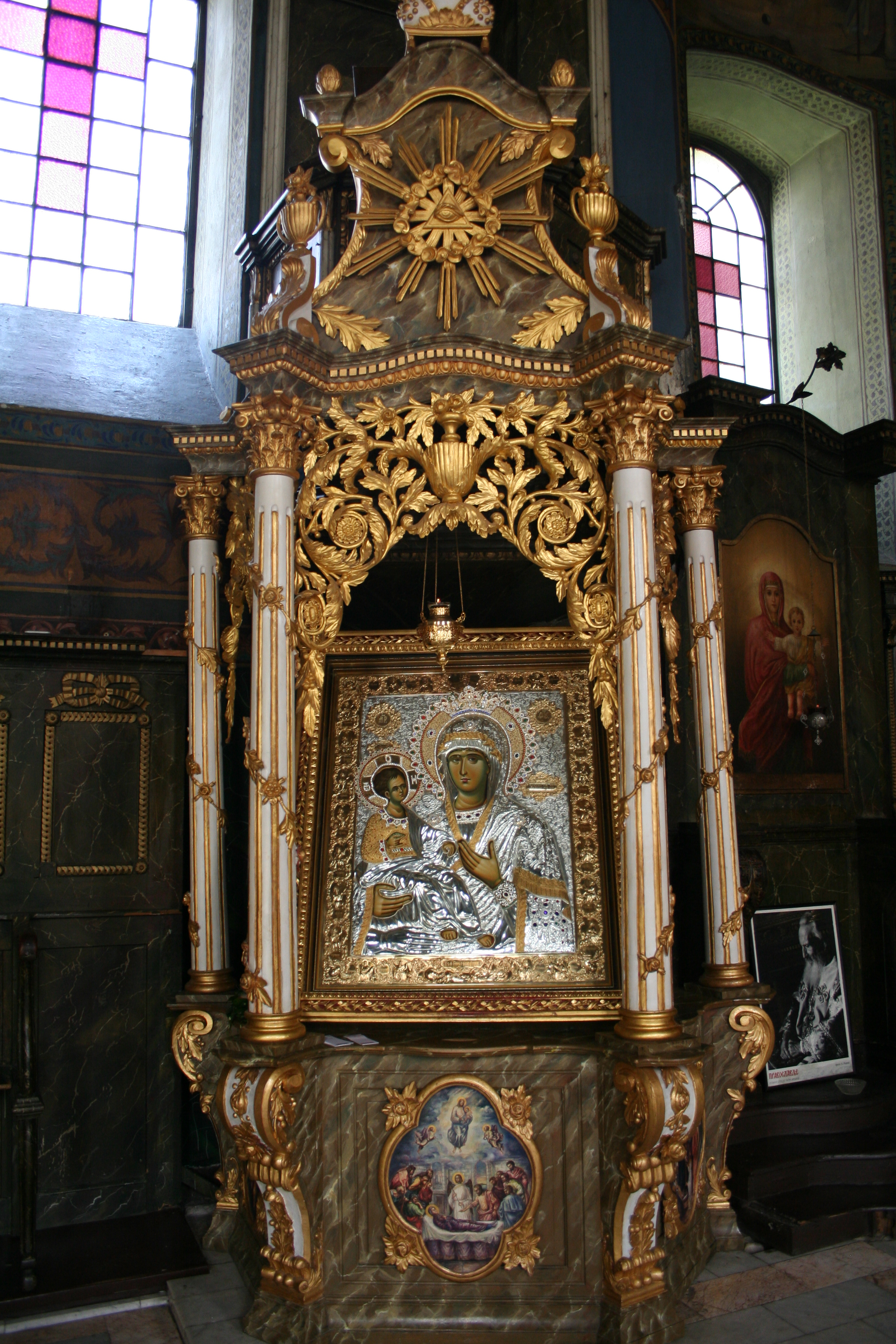
Trojeručica copy by original icon, Saint Peter and Paul Cathedral, Šabac, Serbia

== See also ==
- Votive deposit
- Tama (votive)
