= Votive paintings of Mexico =

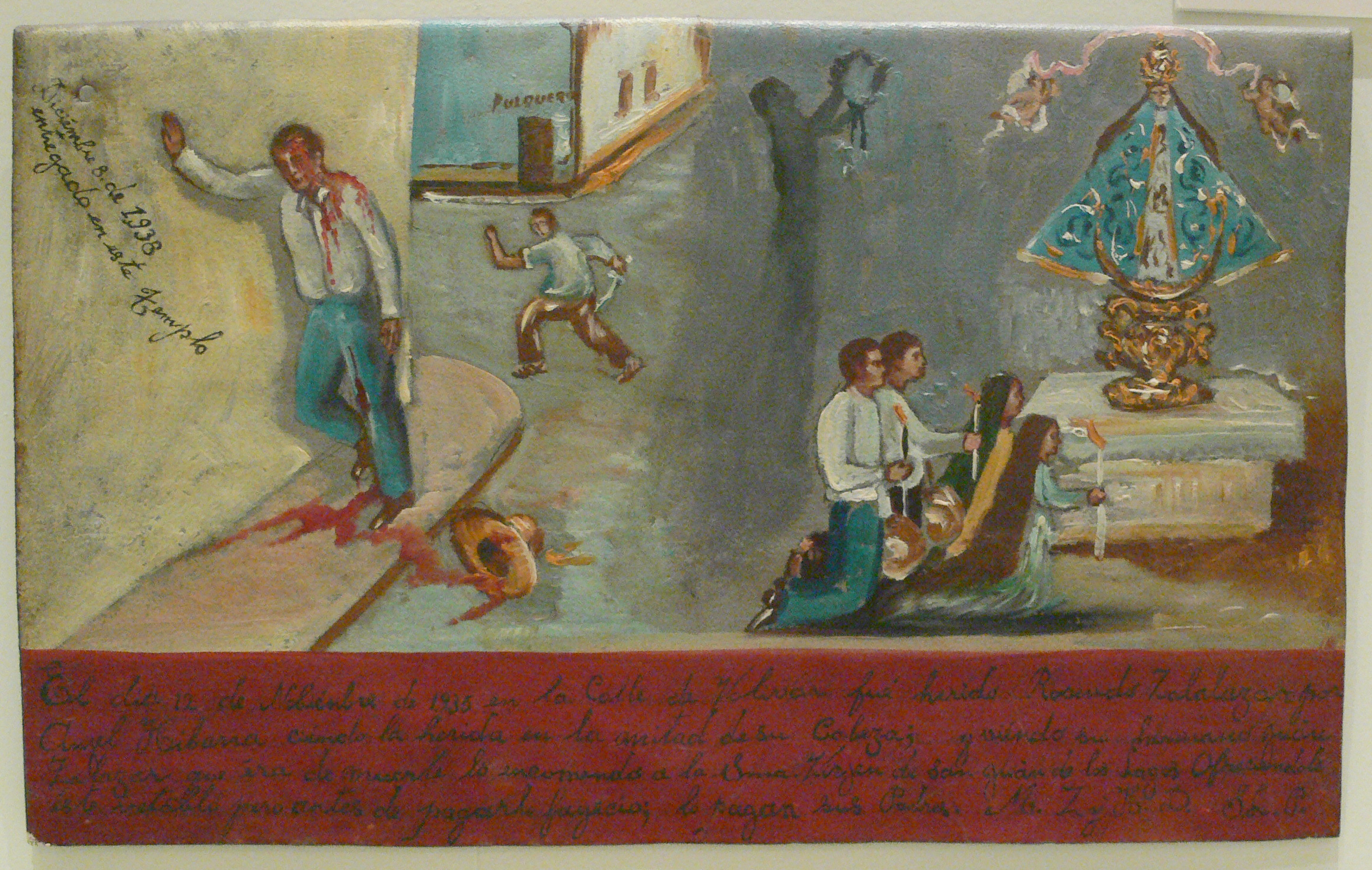
Votive painting dedicated to Our Lady of San Juan de los Lagos

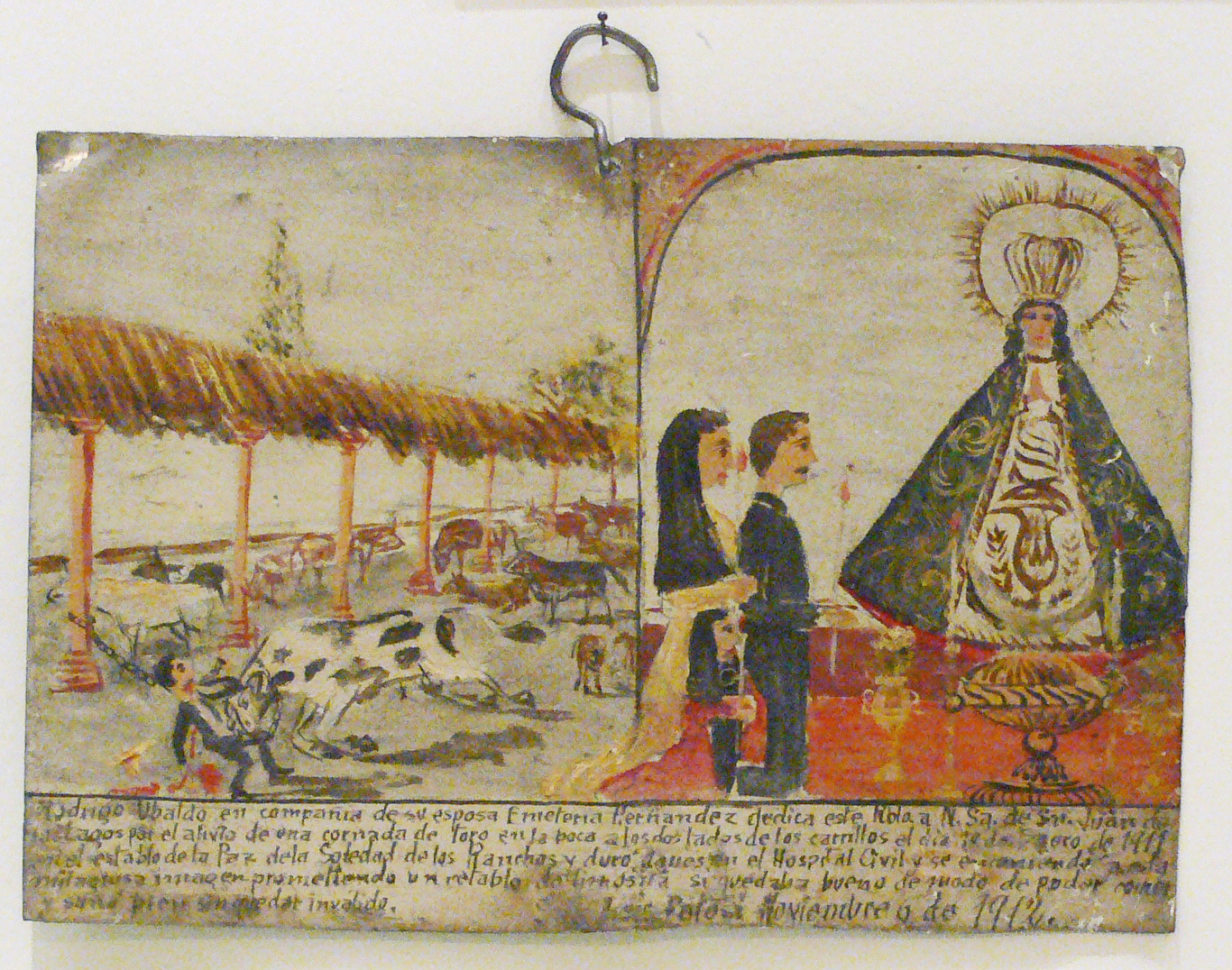
1911 painting; the man survived an attack by a bull.

Votive paintings in Mexico go by several names in Spanish such as “ex voto,” “retablo” or “lámina,” which refer to their purpose, place often found, or material from which they are traditionally made respectively. The painting of religious images to give thanks for a miracle or favour received in this country is part of a long tradition of such in the world. The offering of such items has more immediate precedence in both the Mesoamerican and European lines of Mexican culture, but the form that most votive paintings take from the colonial period to the present was brought to Mexico by the Spanish. As in Europe, votive paintings began as static images of saints or other religious figures which were then donated to a church. Later, narrative images, telling the personal story of a miracle or favor received appeared. These paintings were first produced by the wealthy and often on canvas; however, as sheets of tin became affordable, lower classes began to have these painted on this medium. The narrative version on metal sheets is now the traditional and representative form of votive paintings, although modern works can be executed on paper or any other medium.

Narrative votive paintings can be found by the thousands in many locations in Mexico although certain shrines and sanctuaries such as that of the Virgin of Guadalupe and in Chalma attract a very large number of these. Due their proliferation, especially in the 18th and 19th century, many older votive paintings have left the places they were deposited and found their way into public and private collections. The collecting of these was begun by Diego Rivera, whose work, along with those of a number of other painters past and present, has been influenced by them. Frida Kahlo's collection of ex votos is on public display in her family home, which she later shared with Rivera, her husband.

== Definition ==
Most votive paintings in Mexico are small, depicting the petitioner, the saint or other religious figure and a description of the favor or miracle received. The purpose of the painting is to give testimony and thanks for the divine help. Most votive paintings depict a kind of near disaster, such as car accidents and robbery, which the believer survived or recuperation from sickness or injury.

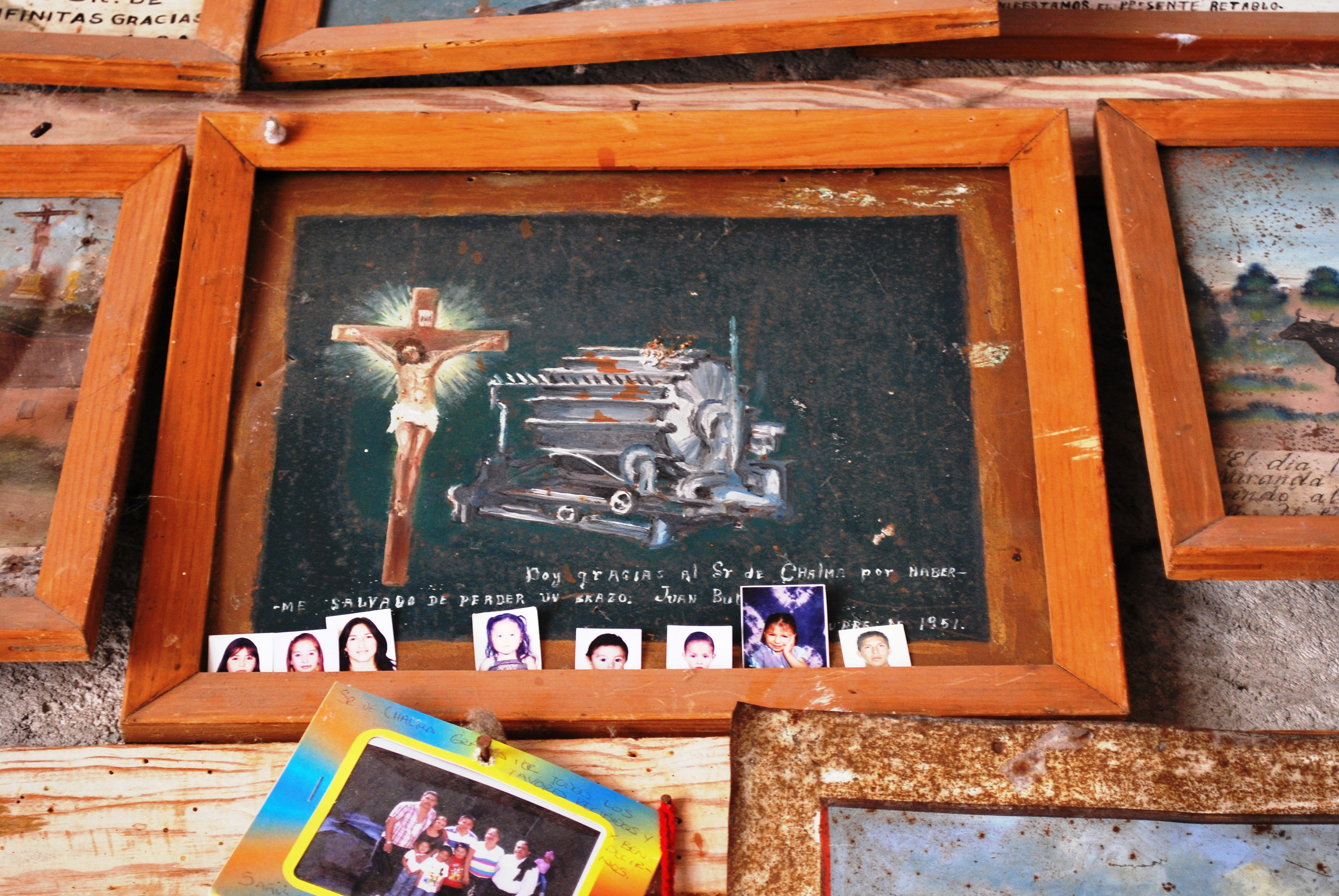
For surviving a factory accident in 1951

Votive painting go by several names in Mexico, some of which overlap with other artworks or offerings. A common name is ex voto. This phrase comes from Latin and means from the vow made. This refers to the fact that many of these paintings are made and brought to churches or other holy sites to fulfill a vow made to the religious persona. However, the term “ex voto” also applies to any number of other objects left for similar purposes, stamped metal pieces wax figures or other crafted items, often fastened near the image which was petitioned. Another common name is “retablo.” This is also from Latin and means “behind the altar” as many of these votive paintings could be found behind church altars up until the mid 20th century. However, “retablo” also refers to any painting or artwork found behind altar. Most of these are static images of saints. These two common terms are generally used interchangeably, but other names such as “lamina” (referring to the metal plates used to paint the images on) are used as well.

Unlike static images of saints, these votive paintings are considered to be very public and intensely personal expressions of faith, often signed and even painted by the petitioner. Votive paintings of this type are found in various Christian countries, but the type most commonly associated with Mexico are painted on small sheets of tin or other metal of about a foot in length. Many have been created by artists hired for their creation, especially in the past when literacy was not common.

== Origin and history ==
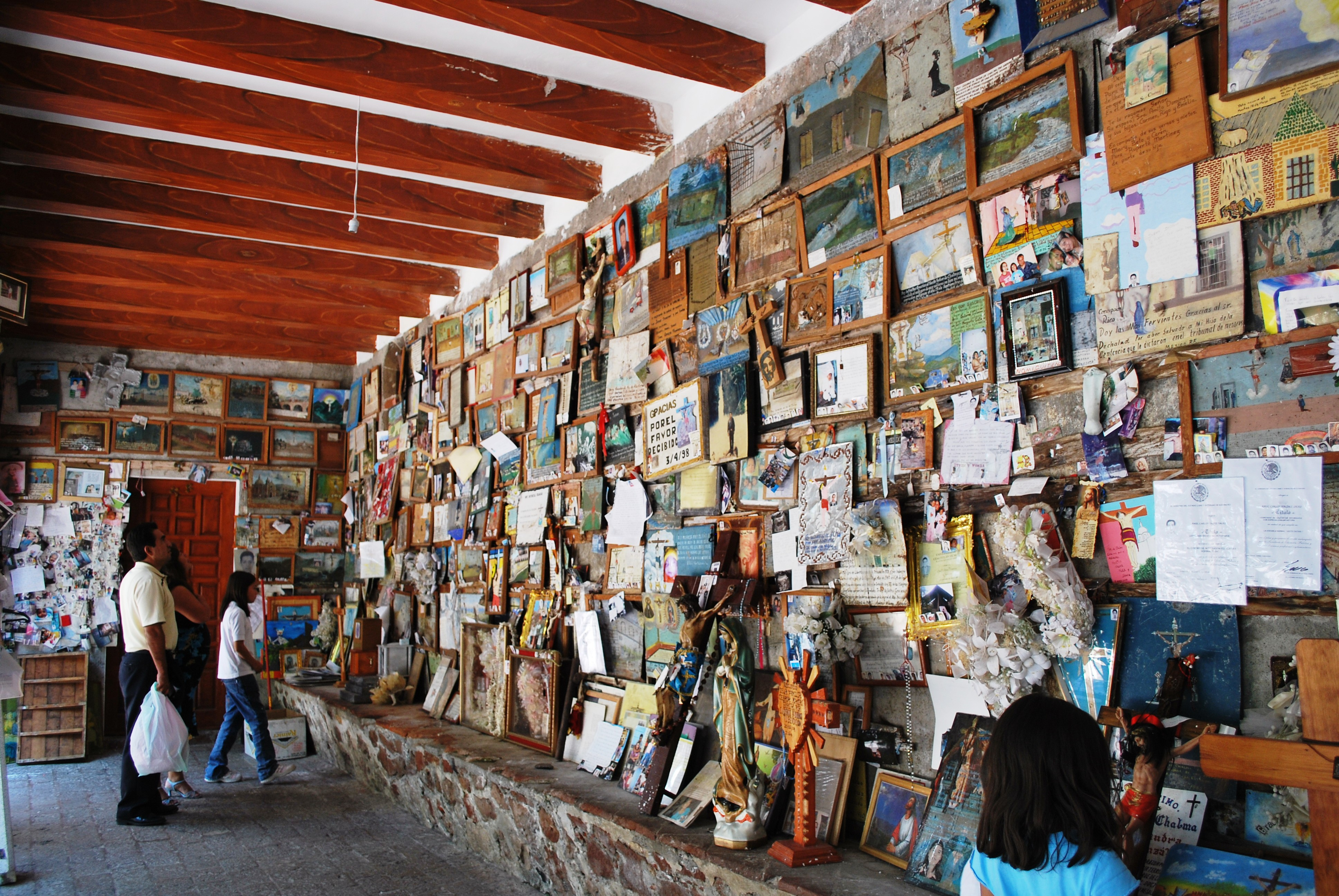
Room dedicated with votive paintings and other ex votos at the Sanctuary of Chalma in Mexico State

Examples of votive art can be found in various places around the globe and at many different periods of history. In Mesoamerica, developed cultures such as the Olmec, Zapotec, Maya and Mexica had sophisticated religious systems and evidence of votive offerings have been found at many temples, including the Templo Mayor in modern Mexico City, where many of the offerings are left to the rain god Tlaloc and the war god Huitzilopochtli. Many ex voto offerings were related to hunting, war and agriculture. A number of cave paintings found in northwest Mexico are thought to be votive in purpose.

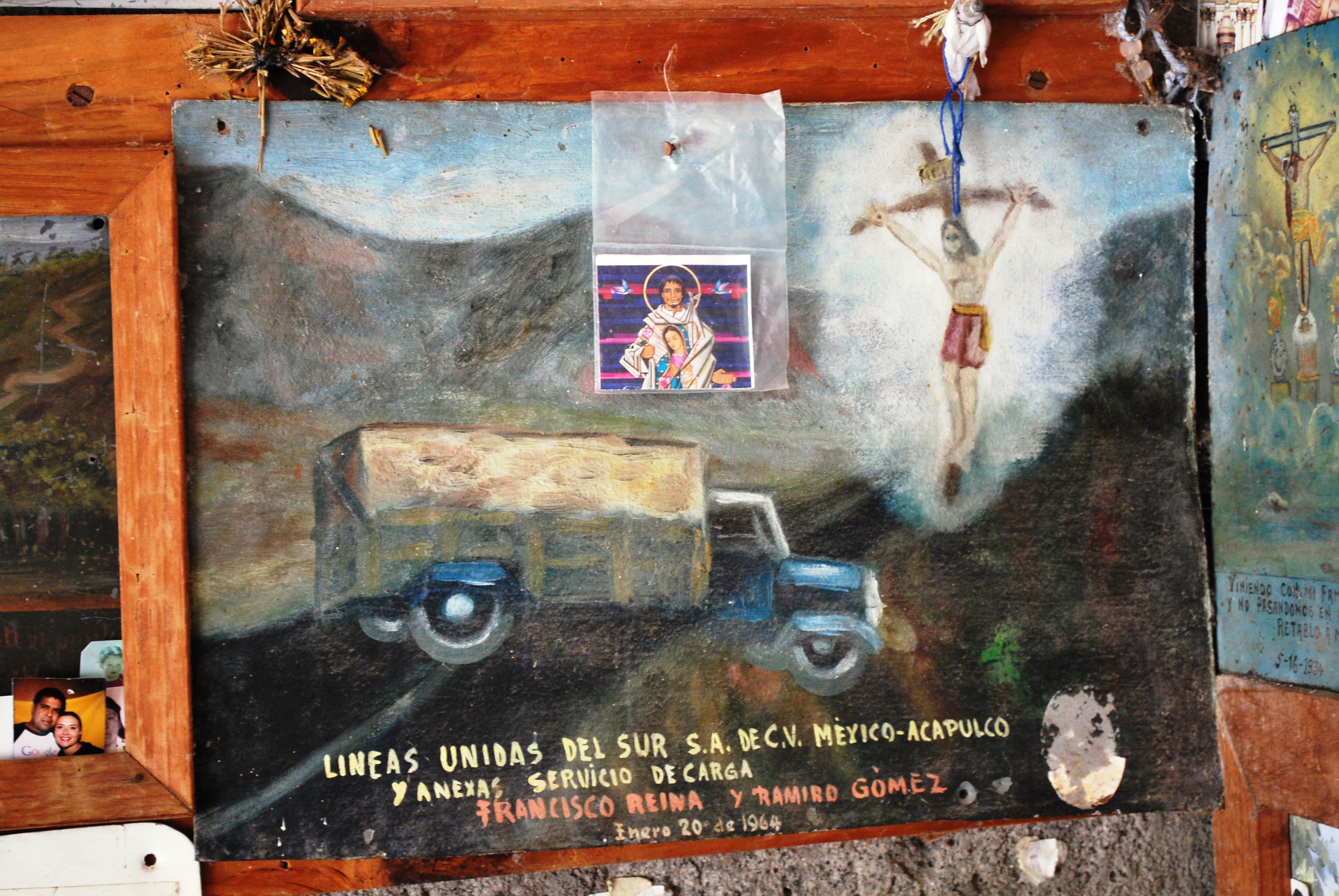
Truck accident, 1964

The European tradition can be definitively traced back to ancient Greece and can be seen though various European cultures over the centuries. With the dominance of Christianity, ex votos took on Christian themes. Ex voto paintings of the type seen today in Mexico began as artworks commissioned by wealthy patrons as a result of an answered prayer or recovery from illness. These have their origins in 15th century Italy, and spread over Europe quickly and eventually were painted or commissioned by various levels of society. Ex voto paintings started as two types: one of a static image of a saint or other personage and one with a depiction of the miracle. The static images came first and vary little. By the 16th century, the narrative version had been established.

The European ex voto tradition was introduced shortly after the Conquest with the earliest known to exist dating from the 1590s. In fact, there is a record of the conquistador Hernán Cortés making an ex-voto to give thanks for being able to walk away from a scorpion bite without becoming ill. As in Europe, the tradition began with wealthy families having depictions of saints painted with the narrative version coming shortly thereafter. In a number of respects, the Mexican Catholic ex voto tradition is a blending of the European and Mesoamerican traditions, especially in the early colonial period. Many ex votos are dedicated to the Virgin of Guadalupe, who is often considered to be a transfiguration of the mother goddess Tonantzin. On some depictions of saints from this time can be seen fangs, which are associated with Quetzalcoatl. Since the establishment of the Mexican Catholic ex voto, the tradition has remained intact to the present day with relatively little change.

The wealthy had their votive paintings done on canvas and these were donated to churches. Most votive paintings would be of this type until the 18th century. At this time, sheets of tin became relatively inexpensive, allowing for the masses to donate pieces made by themselves or by a local artist. The most prolific period of votive painting production by the lower classes occurred from the late 18th to early 19th centuries. In addition to the availability of tin sheets, another reason for the popularity of votive paintings was the political instability of Mexico from the late 18th century through much of the 19th. This promoted the devotion to local images and folk saints, along with pilgrimages to their sites. Both types of votive paintings, static images and narrative ones, were widely produced in the 19th century. Static images on tin were produced for home shrines and narrative images were made to donate or to leave at pilgrimage sites. Static images are fairly uniform, but the narrative ones show a wide range of creativity.

Until the end of the 19th century, it is estimated that thousands of hand-painted votive paintings were produced by workshops, with a number in highly embossed and decorated tin frames. At the end of the 19th century, votive paintings, especially of the static type, fell out of favor with the arrival of cheaper chromolithographs from France and Germany. The narrative type has survived into the 20th century due to its personal nature. There has been some evolution in the folk art. Paintings to commemorate a special event or address a concern in an individual's life have begun to appear. Votive paintings created to petition often relate to money, health and general welfare. However, the majority still depict the salvation from a dangerous event, illness or injury, and votive paintings exist depicting the 1985 Mexico City earthquake and the World Trade Center attack of 2001. More modern medical afflictions include alcoholism and cancer.

Traditional votive painting artists, called “retableros” (from the word “retablo”) still exist. One notable artist is Alfredo Vilchis in Mexico City. His work is considered to be an important testament to life in the 20th century, but he still paints on metal sheets. Another artist is Jose Lopez, who began painting when he had a cancerous tumor in one of his legs and prayed to the Virgin of Juquila in Oaxaca to spare his life. Part of his ex voto is to paint for others. Petitioners have include ordinary people as well as sports figures and priests. Other well known retableros in Mexico of the past two centuries include Vicente Barajas and Hermeneguildo Bustos.

== Structure and subject matter ==
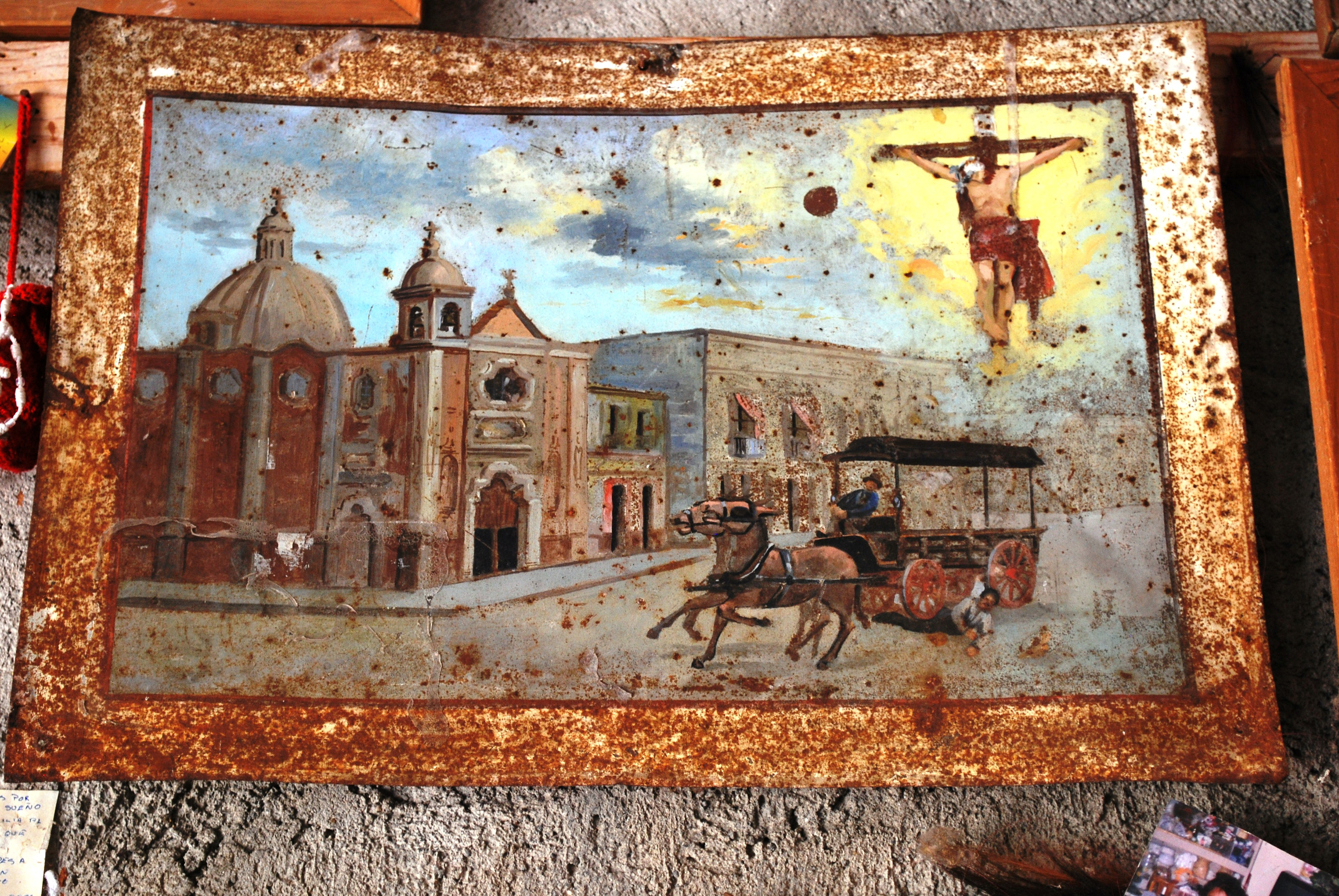
Votive painting in frame at the Sanctuary of Chalma; the offeror is being run over by the carriage.

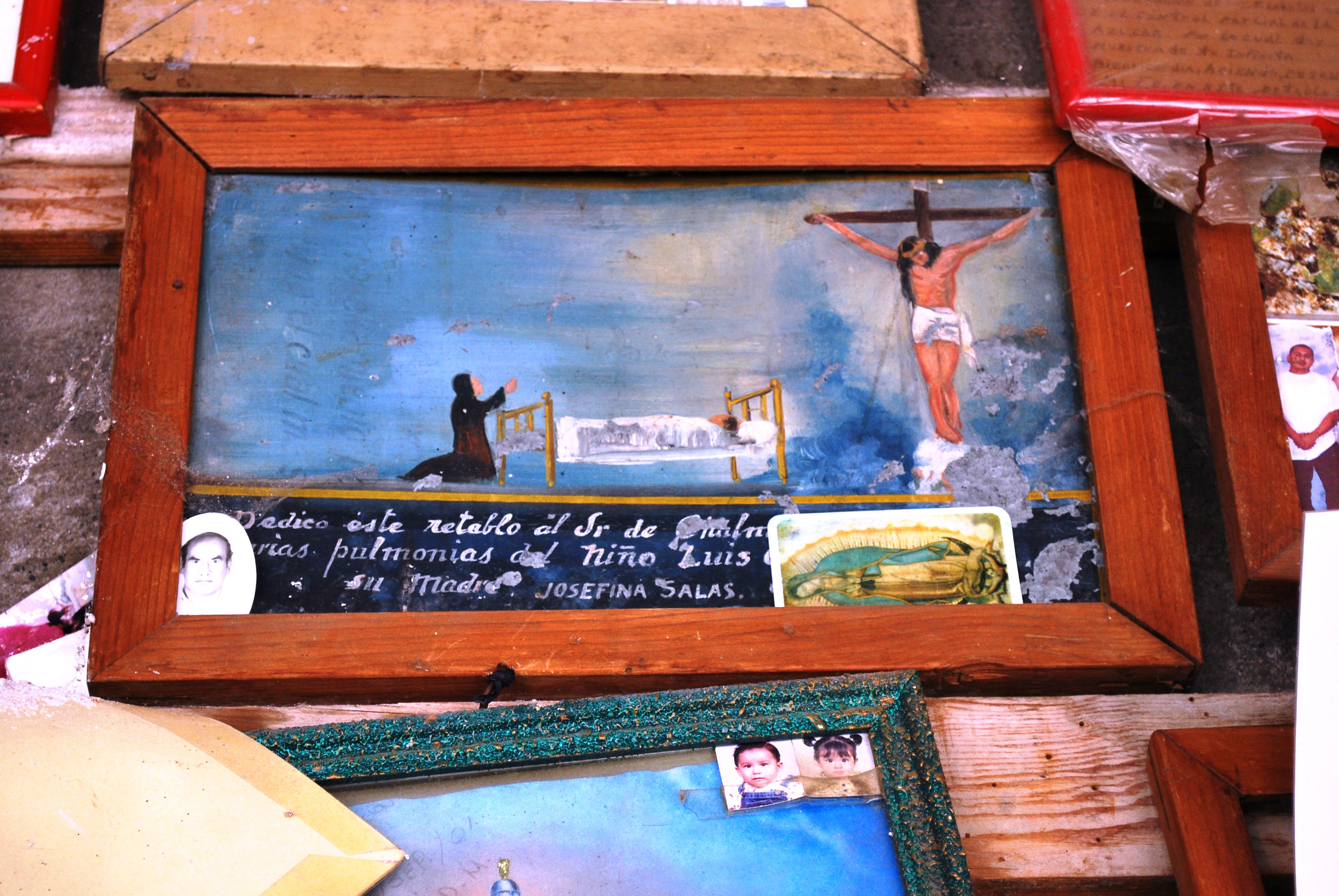
Votive paintings to the Señor de Chalma for the recuperation of a child from a pulmonary problem

Although votive paintings have changed in styles and materials used, certain characteristics have remained the same up to the present day. The metal sheet or other canvas is laid horizontally. Most of the space is taken up with one or more scenes narrating the event, with an image of the saint or other figure floating at the top. At the bottom, a line separates the depiction from a written testimony below. The miraculous event can be shown in one or more scenes. When an illness is recounted, the stricken one often is shown surrounded by his or her family who pray for recovery. In the more dramatic scenes, events surrounding an accident are recounted where the victim has escaped grave danger. Because these paintings commemorate an action that has already occurred, depiction of the miraculous cure or rescue event is constructed purely from the imagination of the artist. God or a Saint floating above the scene is often in the right hand corner and is often surrounded by clouds to indicate his/her heavenly presence. The narrative written beneath the scene of the painting supplies the synopsis for what is often a two-act play: a grim, even catastrophic event, involving the world of mortals, followed by the divine intervention of the proper saint. Modern votive “paintings” are frequently made on paper, and often have the look of children's art, most likely designed and created by the giver. They may include photographs, or even photocopies. Even those who have been commissioned are often not done by classically trained artists. They often have no clear perspective, and spelling errors are common.

The most common scenes depicted in votive paintings are related to health, with many dedicated after operations. Survival of accidents is a close second. Older and modern votive paintings have depicted car and cart accidents, falls into hot tallow, electrocutions, animal attacks and many different diseases. Violent events such as attacks by robbers, police, drunken husbands, fires, earthquakes, storms and mine collapses also appear. People depicted range from farmers, to miners, to politicians and prostitutes. Surgeries are depicted complete with masked doctors, oxygen tanks and other paraphernalia. While these are the most common themes, almost any subject is sufficient to justify creating one, from finding a missing child or mule to fixing a leak in a stock pond. Written descriptions often emphasize the dramatic and express a sense of fatalism.

== Significance ==
Ex votos of all types are found in nearly all Mexican churches, with hundreds of thousands of votive paintings to be found in churches and shrines all over the country. Certain sanctuaries or pilgrimage sites are known for having extremely large collections of votive paintings. These include the Basilica of Our Lady of Guadalupe in Mexico City, the Sanctuary of Chalma in Mexico State, the Sanctuary of Nuestra Señora de Patrocinio in Zacatecas, the shrine of the Virgin of Ocotlan in Tlaxcala, the shrine of Our Lady of San Juan de los Lagos in Jalisco and the sanctuary of Santo Niño de Atocha in Fresnillo.

These paintings have artistic, cultural and historic value as they provide insight into the lives of everyday people and the issues they have faced over time. This is particularly true for 18th and 19th century Mexico. One area that these paintings have documented over time is that of diseases and their treatments. Many depictions take place in the home where doctors and family members are in attendance. Settings also include hospitals and operating rooms where doctors and nurses can be seen using surgical instruments and other medical equipment. Beginning in the 20th century, more contemporary issues such as immigration have been represented in these paintings and studied. Many of these paintings show the problems faced by immigrants as they cross the border and live in a new culture.

In Bolivia, the Mexican government sponsored an exhibition of 41 contemporary votive painting artists' works in that country's national museum of art, called “El exvoto religioso y sus opciones contemporáneas” (The religious ex voto and its contemporary options).

Past Mexican artists such as Frida Kahlo, Roberto Montenegro, Diego Rivera, Juan O'Gorman and David Alfaro Siqueiros have used elements of these paintings in their own work. The influence of ex votos is very clear in Frida Kahlo's Portrait of Wilhelm Kahlo, in which she writes about her father in text under his portrait, separated by a line. Today, individual artists from diverse cultural backgrounds draw creative inspiration from this popular art form. One such artist is Francisco Larios Osuna who creates painting in the votive form to document events from his own life as well as the lives of people he knows. However, unlike traditional votive paintings, these works are created by and for the artists and not for the subject of the piece. His work has been commissioned by the Mexican government and can be seen in the consulates located in Los Angeles, Miami, Houston and Brownsville . Another area where the influence of votive paintings can be seen in mural work and other art in the west and southwest United States.

The large number of votive paintings that have been left at churches and other locations has in some cases led to large piles of them on floors, left without care. While visiting a church in Guadalupe, Zacatecas in 1917, Siqueiros came across such a pile. Finding one of paper that especially interested him discarded on the floor, he thought nothing of taking it with him. However, a priest of the church denounced the act to authorities. Given that church space is finite, many older votive paintings are either thrown away or sold to vendors to make way for new ones. Interest in the paintings began with Diego Rivera, who considered them to be an important testimony to Mexican history and culture. He and Frida Kahlo became the first collectors. By the end of the 20th century, they became valuable collector's items and can now be found in museums and private collections in various parts of the world.

In 2010 the Mabee-Gerrer Museum of Art in Shawnee, OK hosted an exhibition of votive paintings titled Objects of Devotion. They also devote a permanent gallery to Mexican votive art.

== See also ==
- Milagro (votive)
- Retablo
