= Calamus Creek =

Calamus Creek may refer to:

- Calamus Creek (Minnesota), a stream in Douglas County, Minnesota
- Calamus Creek (Wisconsin), a tributary of the Beaver Dam River in southeastern Wisconsin
