= Calamis (4th century BC) =

Ancient Greek sculptor

Calamis (fl. 4th century BC) was a Greek sculptor. One of his pupils was Praxias.
