= Calamus Creek (Minnesota) =

Stream in Douglas County, Minnesota, U.S.

Coordinates: 45°58′40″N 95°11′23″W

Calamus Creek is a stream in Douglas County, in the U.S. state of Minnesota.

Calamus Creek was named for the abundance of the calamus plant in the area.

== See also ==
- List of rivers of Minnesota
