= Retablo =

Devotional painting

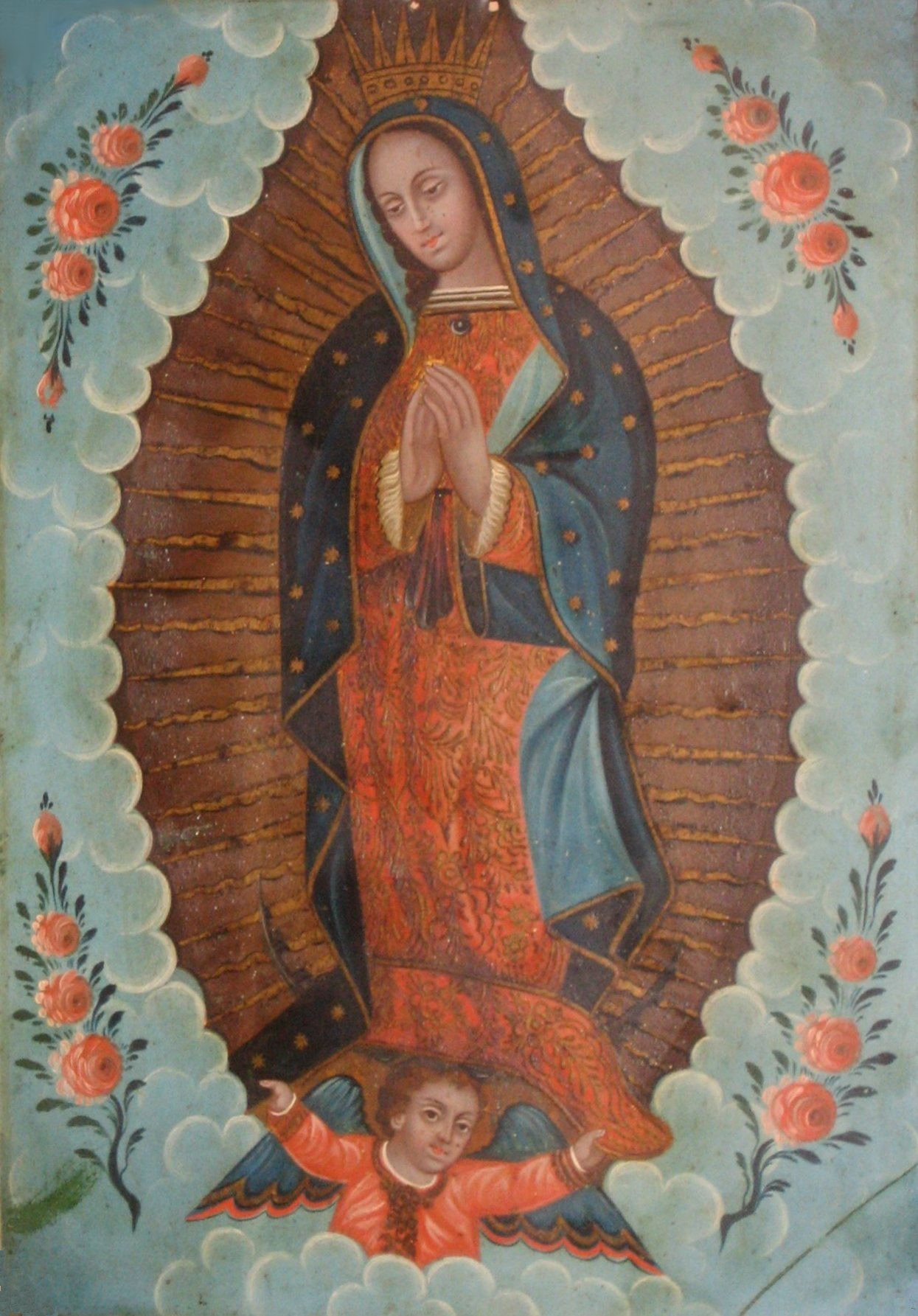
Mexican oil paint on tin retablo of 'Our Lady of Guadalupe', 19th century, El Paso Museum of Art

A retablo is a devotional painting, especially a small popular or folk art one using iconography derived from traditional Catholic church art. More generally retablo is also the Spanish term for a retable or reredos above an altar, whether a large altarpiece painting or an elaborate wooden structure with sculptures. Typically this includes painting, sculpture, or a combination of the two, and an elaborate framework enclosing it. The Latin etymology of the Spanish word means "board behind". Aside from being found behind the altar, "similar ornamental structures are built and carved over facades and doorways", called overdoors.

Small retablos are devotional or votive paintings, often on rectangular sheets of tin that illustrate holy images such as Christ, the Virgin Mother, or one of the hundreds of saints. Many are ex-votos ("from a vow") that depict the story that led to their commission, usually dangerous or threatening events that occurred, and which the person survived, thanks to the intercession of a sacred person – God, Mary, or a saint. They are made as a way of thanking the sacred person for protection in precarious situations, such as surviving an illness or earthquake. This class of ex-votos often shows the protected humans in a dangerous situation, and the sacred person who protected them, usually with an inscribed explanation of the events, with the date and location. Both devotional and especially ex-voto retablos may be deposited at a shrine as a votive offering, or kept at home.

Reredos of the Late Middle Ages and Renaissance in Spain grew extremely large and elaborate, typically using carved and gilded wood, and rising as high as 40 feet or more. The tradition of making them was taken to the new Spanish Empire in America. There, by the late 18th century at least, the word became used for much smaller popular religious paintings, both conventional devotional images, and ex-votos (paintings giving thanks for protection through a specific episode). These were typically made to express gratitude towards the Virgin Mary for saving a person or a loved one from a nearly fatal event.

== The small paintings ==
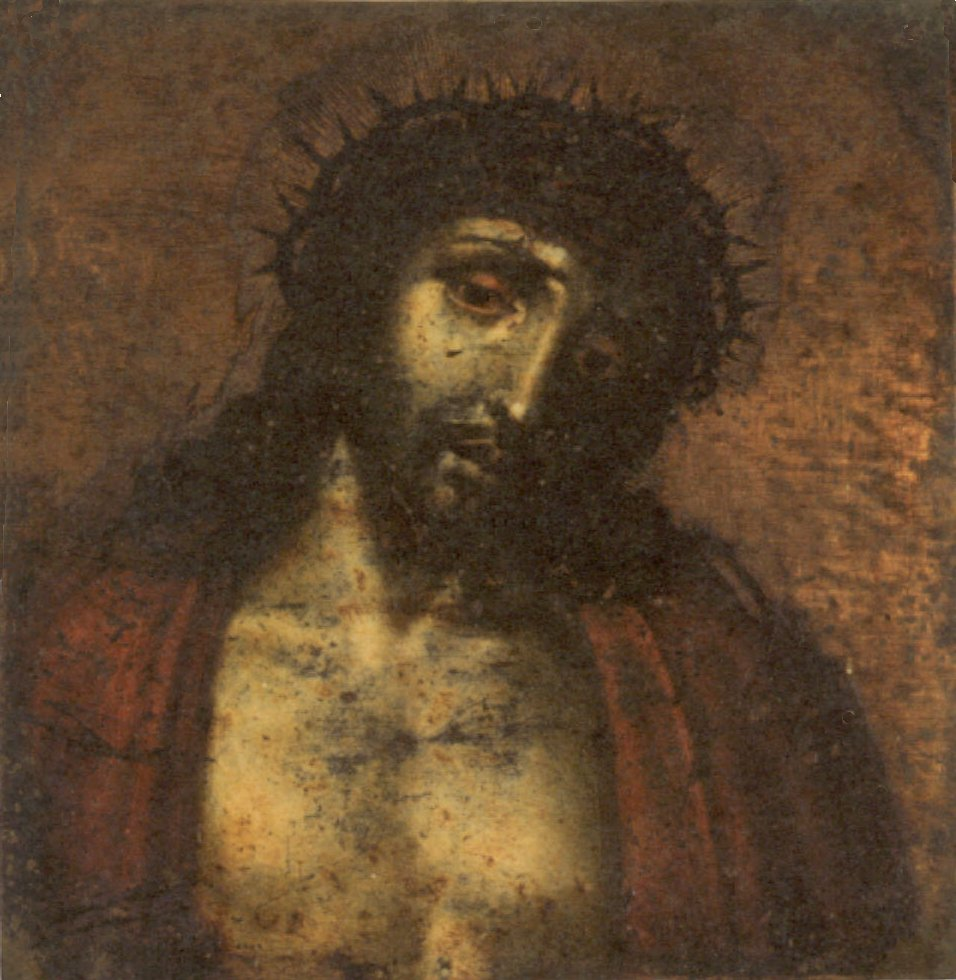
Mexican oil on copper retablo of the traditional subject of the Man of Sorrows, 17th century.

The popular labeling of ex-votos as "Retablos" can be traced back to the late 18th century. In 1950, Mexican artist Roberto Montenegro published a history of Mexican altarpieces which included a votive painting dated 1781, that contained an inscription which offers thanks to Nuestra Señora de Dolores de Xaltocan for renewing the people's health after a severe illness. On the bottom of the votive painting left, a message is inscribed that read en cuia memoria dedica a su Magestad este Retablo (in whose memory he dedicates to her Majesty this retablo).

The oil-painted retablos generated the need for "small retablo factories" to be established to "reproduce the same images" which were then "sold to devout believers who displayed them in home altars to honor their patron Saints." Not only were the retablos purchased by those wanting to show devotion to their patron saints, they were also given when the saints were there for their devotees in hard times. When people wished to express gratitude, they could give retablos that described "the miraculous deed of a saint to whom the petitioner turned to in a time of need". People call upon these saints for aid with rain, harvests, or other outcomes. For example, if a farmer needs rain for his crops he might pray for rain. After the rain comes, a retablo might be created to give thanks to San Ysidro Labrador, the patron saint of farmers. He is "venerated for good weather, agricultural issues and prosperous crops". That figure would most likely be kept in the farmer's house. Each time rain was needed in the future, that farmer might pray in front of that retablo. These traditions are by no means exclusive to Latin America, but are found in all Roman Catholic countries, as well as in classical paganism and many other religions. To judge by survivals, similar small paintings were especially common in the German-speaking Catholic areas of Europe in the Early Modern period. By the 19th century, the process of lithography became very popular for devotional retablos, replacing earlier printmaking methods.

=== Form ===
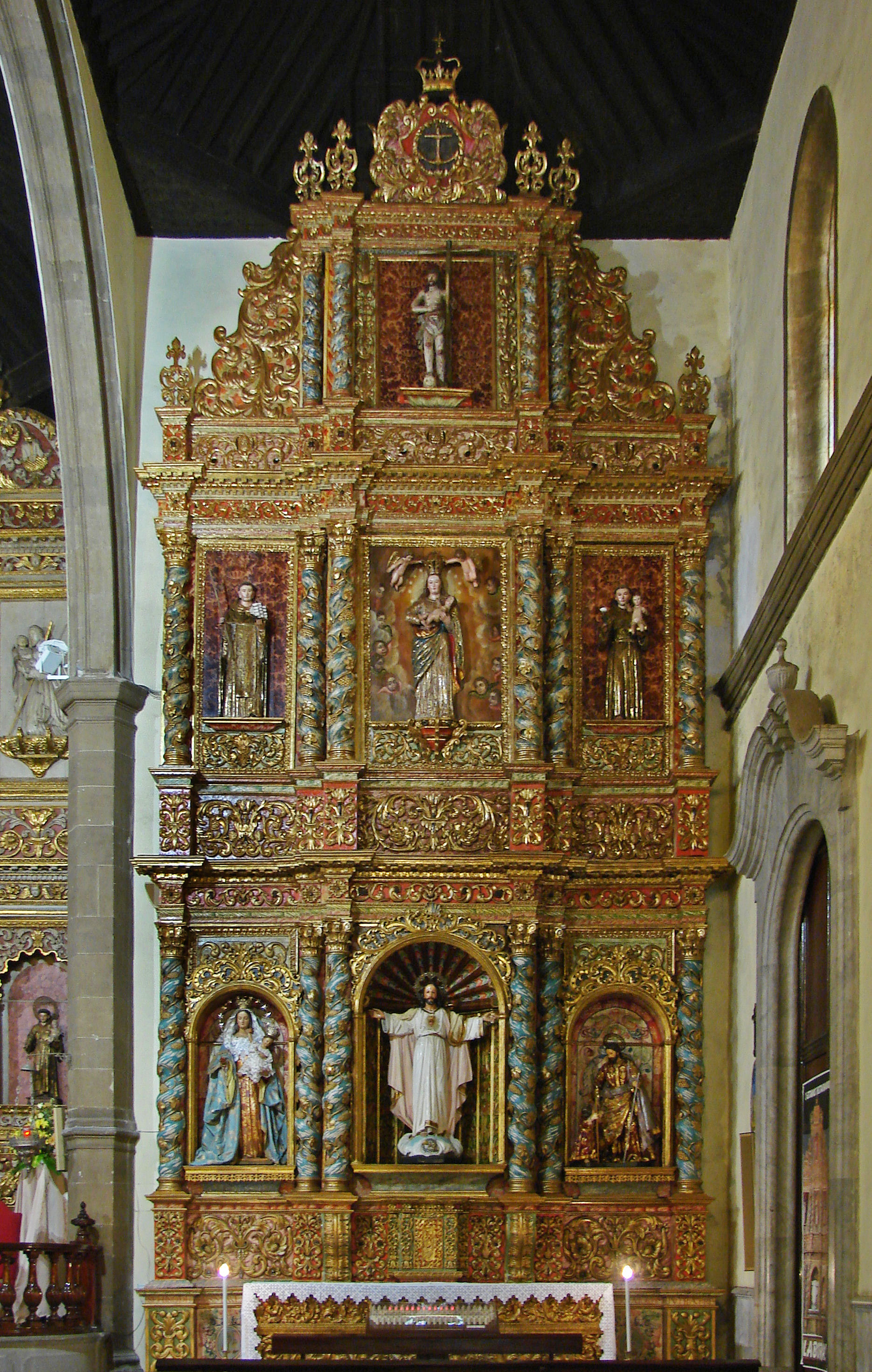
A Baroque carved wood reredos, or retablo in the original Spanish sense, Tenerife.

The way a retablo and ex-voto look is entirely up to the person designing it, so long as it contains the necessary basic elements. The most important part of the retablo is the representation of the miraculous event. That is why most artists try to use bright, vibrant colors to portray the supremacy of the event. An ex-voto is, more often than not, reduced to a smaller size. It is usually about half the size of the original, while still maintaining its rectangular shape. The largest size was about 280 square inches (1,800 cm^{2}). The smallest was about 18 square inches (120 cm^{2}). Some of the most common sizes include 140 square inches (900 cm^{2}) and 140 square inches (900 cm^{2}).

=== Significance ===
Retablos are important to Mexican folk religion because they are a physical representation of holy images such as Christ, the Virgin Mother, or one of the many thousands of saints. They come from the need humans have to interact on a personal level with divine spirits. Retablos are evidentiary support for communication between the divine and humans.

This tradition of retablos was also brought into New Mexico and southern Colorado by Franciscan friars. Due to the remoteness of this frontier and lack of metals, retablos were made of wood. These crude retablos were coated with a gesso made with gypsum and rabbit skin glue. Pigments also were made locally from natural materials, colored piles of earth, plant extracts, cochineal bugs, and lamp black.

These traditional retablos and other indigenous religious art were removed by bishop Jean-Baptiste Lamy throughout New Mexico after the conquest of these territories by the US Army. In 1924 the Spanish Colonial Arts Society was formed, and since then these unique traditions of New Mexico have been preserved.

=== Contemporary revival ===
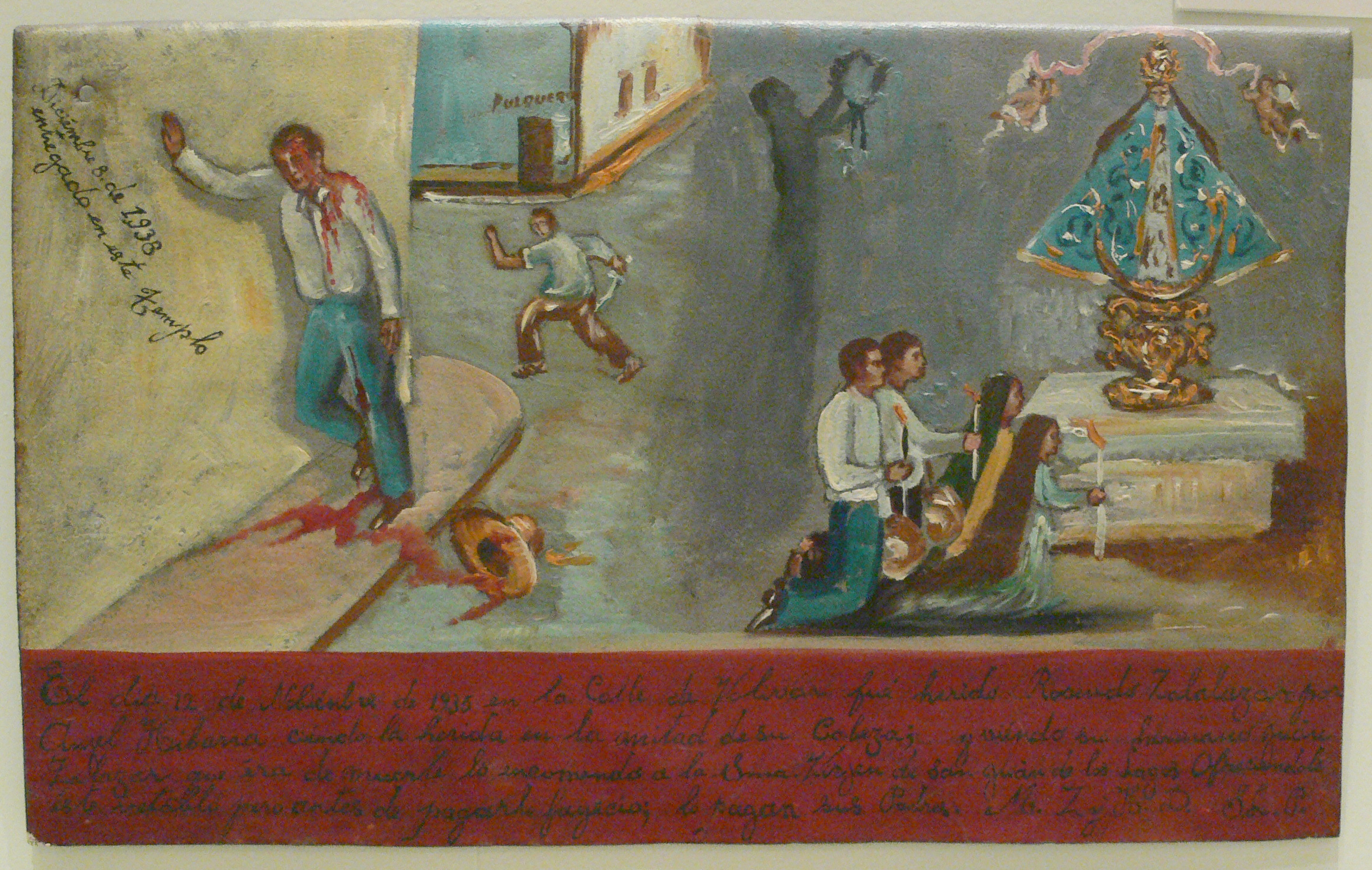
Mexican ex-voto of 1935 – survival of a stabbing; Our Lady of San Juan de los Lagos again.

During the 1940s, a resurgence of the art began in Peru, due in large part to the research and philanthropy of Alicia Bustamante, a member of the Peruvian indigenista movement, who encouraged an artist named Joaquin Lopez Antay to save and revitalize the retablo art form. She enlisted him "to make retablos that included themes of everyday life – harvests, markets, and fiestas. A distinction emerged between the retablo for ritual and religious purposes and the retablo as decoration." Many others in the area, including Nicario Jimenez Quispe, continued along the same path as Antay, creating a popular art that was displayed during the annual branding ceremonies of cattle, sheep, and llamas. These retablos have achieved status as important heirlooms passed on within families that symbolize protection, fertility, and healing. They are also sold as art.

== See also ==
- Altarpiece
- Votive paintings of Mexico

== Bibliography ==
- Correa, Phyllis M. (2000). "Otomi Rituals and Celebrations: Crosses, Ancestors, and Resurrection". The Journal of American Folklore. 113 (450): 436–450. doi:10.2307/542041. ISSN 0021-8715. JSTOR 542041.
- Durand, Jorge (1995). Miracles on the Border: Retablos of Mexican Migrants to the United States. Tucson: University of Arizona Press. ISBN 978-0-8165-1497-7.
- Orozco Palma, Miguel (n.d.). "The Santa Heduwiges Retablo in my family". Nuevo Casas Grandes, Chihuahua, Mexico. Archived from the original on 2012-06-22.
- Eddy, James (n.d.). "Mexican Retablos 19th Century Devotional Art". San Francisco, California. Archived from the original on 2011-07-14.
- Fernandez, Justino (1964). "An Aesthetic of Mexican Art: Ancient and Modern". The Journal of Aesthetics and Art Criticism. 23 (1): 21–28. doi:10.2307/428135. ISSN 0021-8529. JSTOR 428135.
- Lange, Yvonne (1974). "Lithography, an Agent of Technological Change in Religious Folk Art: A Thesis". Western Folklore. 33 (1): 51–64. doi:10.2307/1498251. ISSN 0043-373X. JSTOR 1498251.
- Wroth, William (1982). Christian images in Hispanic New Mexico: the Taylor Museum Collection of santos. The Taylor Museum. ISBN 978-0-295-95934-4.
