= Praxias and Androsthenes =

Greek sculptors

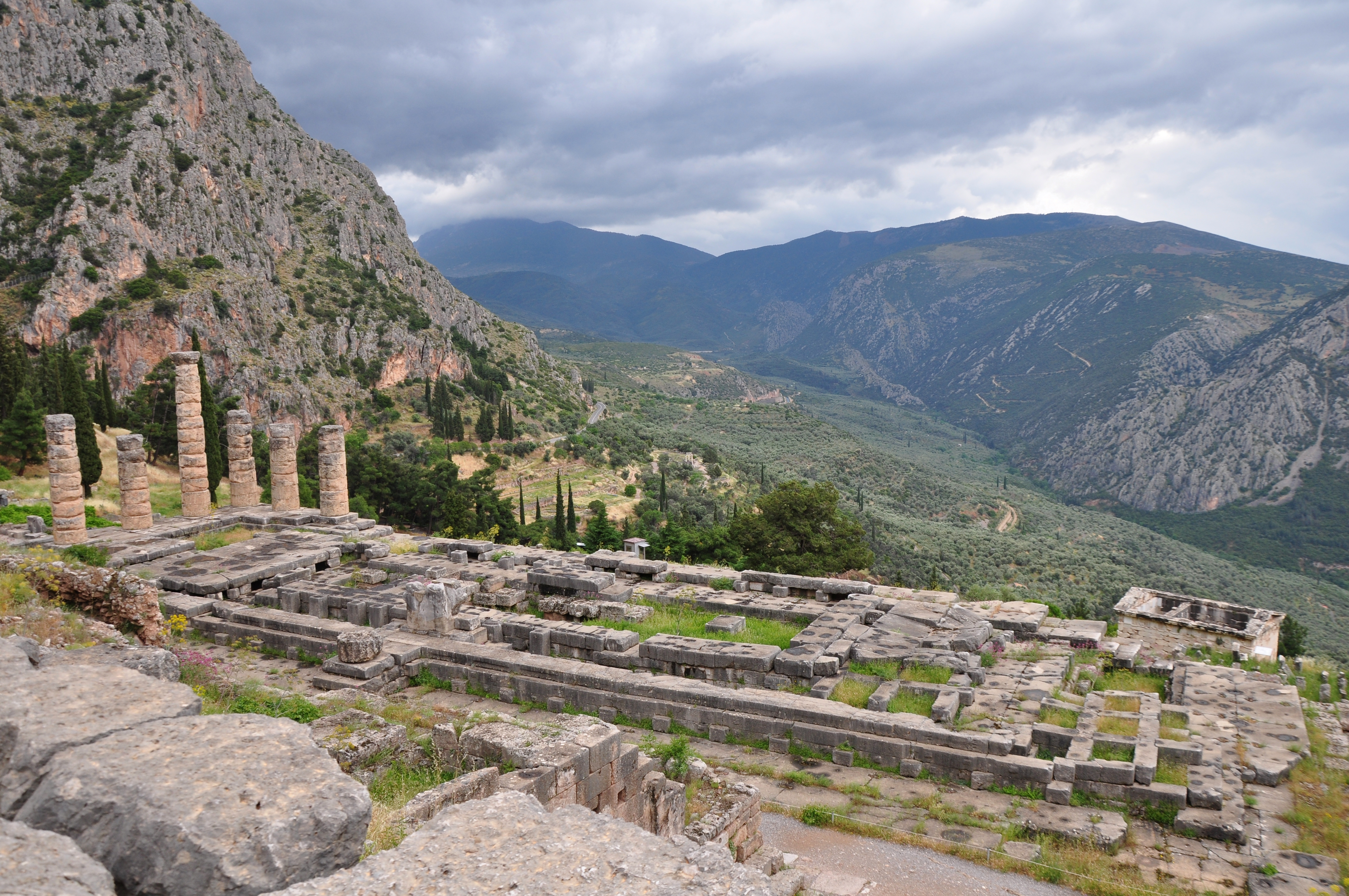
Ruins of the Temple of Apollo at Delphi

Praxias (Ancient Greek: Πραξίας) and Androsthenes (Ancient Greek: Ἀνδροσθένης), were Greek sculptors, who are said by Pausanias (x. 19, 4) to have executed the pediments of the Temple of Apollo at Delphi. Both were Athenians, Praxias a pupil of Calamis. The statement raises historic difficulties, as, according to the leaders of the recent French excavations at Delphi, the temple of Apollo was destroyed about 373 BC and rebuilt by 339 BC, a date which seems too late for the lifetime of a pupil of Calamis. In any case no fragments of the pediments of this later temple have been found, and it has been suggested that they were removed bodily to Rome.
