= Assumption of the Virgin (Palma Vecchio) =

1513 painting by Palma Vecchio

- Assunzione della Vergine (Italian)
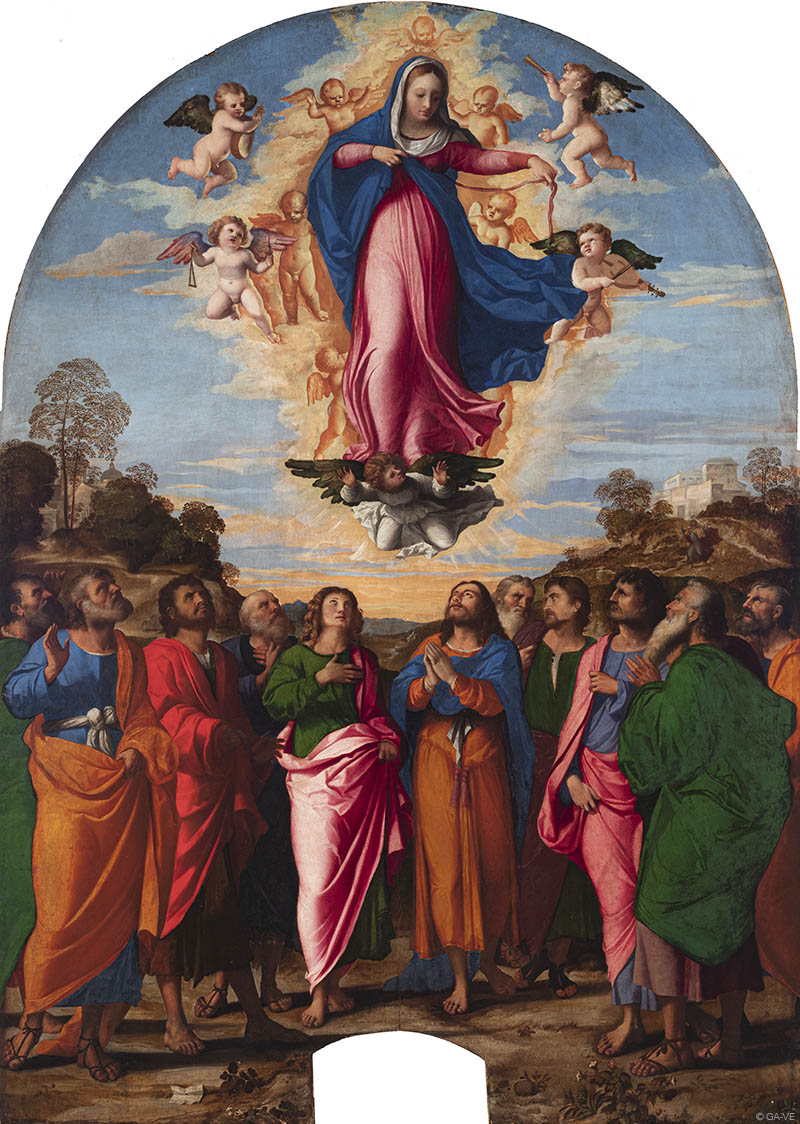
- Artist: Palma Vecchio
- Year: c. 1513
- Medium: Oil on panel
- Dimensions: 191 cm × 137 cm (75 in × 54 in)
- Location: Gallerie dell'Accademia, Venice

The Assumption of the Virgin is an oil on panel painting by Palma Vecchio, created c. 1513, now in the Gallerie dell'Accademia in Venice.

It shows an episode recounted in the apocryphal gospels - the Virgin Mary rising to heaven carried by angels. In this case the legend of the Girdle of Thomas is included, with Mary about to drop the belt of her dress down on Thomas the Apostle.

== History and description ==
The large painting is perhaps the first Vecchio produced in Venice. It was probably commissioned in 1513 and it appears the artist received a fee of 50 ducats from the Scuola di Santa Maria Maggiore's syndics, showing that he was already highly regarded on Venetian territory despite his youth. Giorgio Vasari and Roberto Ridolfi also mention a painting of the Madonna in the Air by Vecchio, then in the Church of San Moisè.

In 1808 the painting and the other works of the Scuola della Carità were confiscated by the Napoleonic authorities in Italy, entered the Gallerie dell'Accademia four years later. A restoration in 1967 confirmed its attribution as an early Vecchio.

== Description ==
The image depicts the Madonna who, contrary to traditional representations, turns her gaze downwards to the apostle. It is heavily influenced by Giovanni Bellini's Virgin in Glory with Saints, now in the church of San Pietro Martire in Murano and by Deposition in the Sepulchre in Iesi by Lorenzo Lotto, particularly in the depiction of the face of the angels supporting the Madonna, and in the slightly awkward angel holding up the ascending Virgin, an unusual representation.

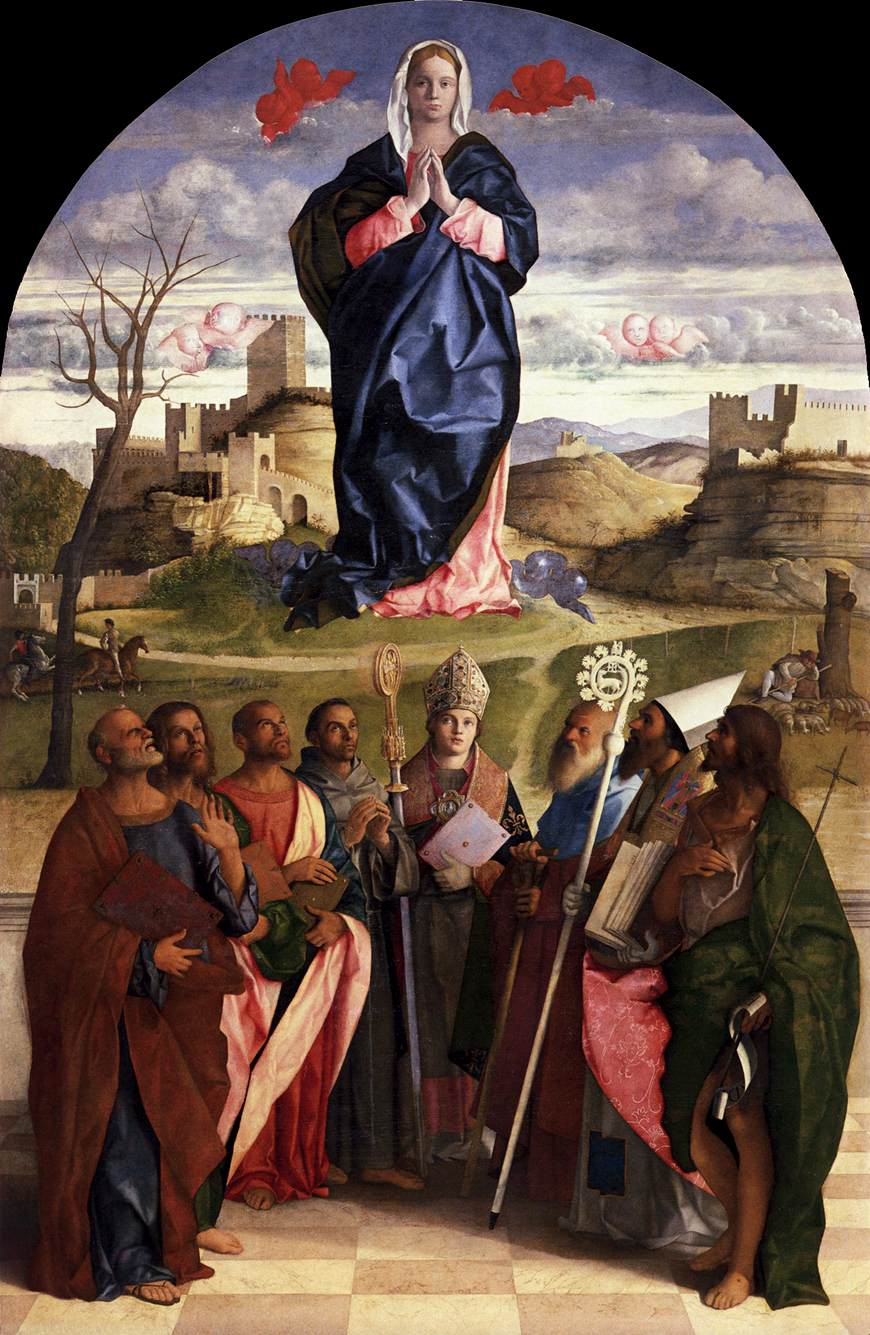
Virgin in Glory with Saints, Giovanni Bellini

The full-length depictions of the apostles are depicted looking toward the sky. They have a sculptural presence and form, perhaps in tribute to the sculptor Tullio Lombardo who was close to the artist. They wear brightly coloured clothes, including red, green, and yellow cloaks, with a small gap at the bottom cut at an unknown date to allow for a tabernacle. In the background is a barren landscape and in the far distance a castle. Above them is the Madonna wearing a pink dress with copious moving folds, a blue flapping cloak and a white veil. Behind her is a golden mandorla (almond-shaped halo) and she is supported by musician angels, including an angel with open wings holding her up, all shown against an intense blue sky. The Madonna holds an ochre belt in her left hand and hands it to the apostle who stands immediately below her with a confused and incredulous gaze - the apocrypha relates that he had not only initially disbelieved in the Resurrection but also the Assumption.

== Bibliography ==
- Mariacher, Giovanni (1975). Palma Vecchio in "The Painters of Bergamo of the Sixteenth Century". Vol. I. Bergamo: Polygraphic Bolis. pp. 215–216.
