= Barbarigo Altarpiece =

1488 painting by Giovanni Bellini

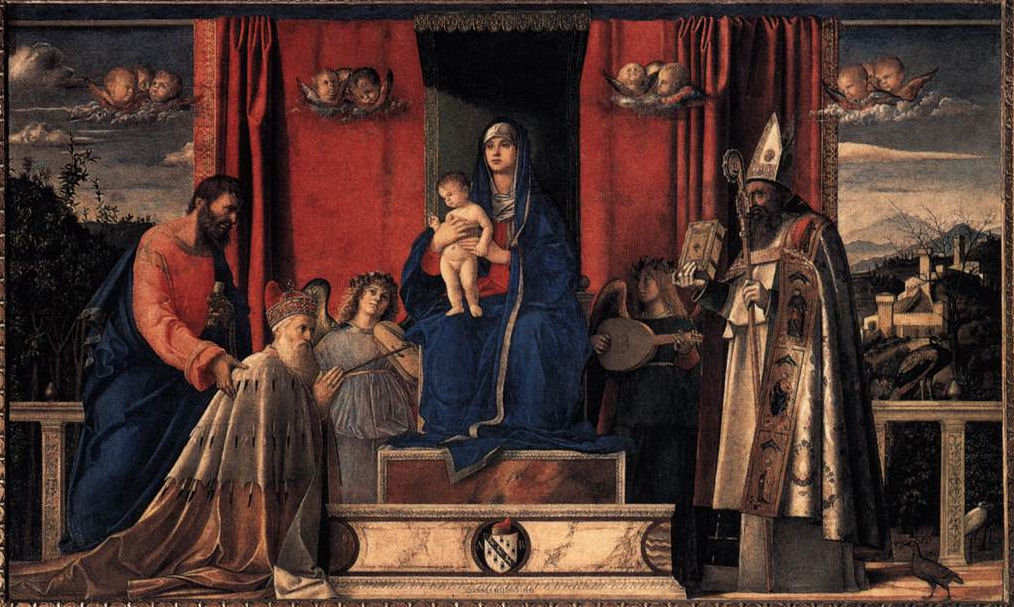
- Artist: Giovanni Bellini
- Year: 1488
- Medium: oil on canvas
- Dimensions: 200 cm × 320 cm (79 in × 130 in)
- Location: San Pietro Martire, Murano

The Barbarigo Altarpiece or Enthroned Madonna and Child with Angel Musicians and Saint Mark, Saint Augustine and Doge Agostino Barbarigo is a 1488 (dated on the throne) oil painting on canvas by Giovanni Bellini, now in the church of San Pietro Martire in Murano.

Its commission is unusually well-documented for a work by Bellini. Uniquely Agostino Barbarigo had taken over from his brother Marco Barbarigo as doge. Marco and Agostino were not on good terms and Agostino was even suspected of killing his brother. To quell these rumours, Agostino began commissioning works promoting himself as the heir to and loyal supporter of his brother's work. These included St Mark's Clocktower (Torre dell'Orologio) from Mauro Codussi, and at the Doge's Palace, the monumental steps (Scala dei Giganti) from the brothers Marco and Pietro Lombardo, and a new wing reaching towards the Rio. He also privately commissioned a majestic funeral monument for Marco and himself in Santa Maria della Carità and commissioned Bellini twice, first to produce the official portrait of Marco for the Sala del Maggior Consiglio (1486–87) and then to produce a "large panel", as his ex-voto for the Doge's Palace.

== Ex-voto ==
In Venice it became the custom in the Renaissance for the higher officials, beginning with the Doge, to commission (at their personal expense) an ex-voto painting in the form of a portrait of themselves with religious figures, usually the Virgin or saints, in thanks for achieving their office. For lower officials only their coat of arms might represent the official. The painting was hung in the public building where they worked or presided.

Aspects of the picture hint at what many contemporaries saw as the excessive self-aggrandizement of the Barberigo brothers. Rather being presented to the Virgin and Child by his name-saint Augustine, as was usual, the Doge is presented by Saint Mark, patron saint of the Venetian Republic, as well as Marco Barberigo. Instead of looking towards the Child, the Doge looks out towards the Venetians passing the painting. There was opposition to hanging it in the Doge's Palace, which may be why Barberigo instead bequeathed it to a convent (so probably saving it from a later fire). Before this it apparently hung in his home, the Palazzo Barbarigo Nani Mocenigo (which survives; not the Palazzo Barbarigo).

In 1501, already dying, Agostino left the canvas to the nunnery of Santa Maria degli Angeli in Murano to be its high altarpiece, but it was soon moved from there (to make room for Titian's Annunciation) to San Pietro Martire. Vasari mentioned it as being in San Michele di Murano but probably mistook it for another Bellini work, now lost, which was already in the Cappella della Santissima Croce in the church of the Camaldolese.

== See also ==
- History of the Doge's Palace in Venice
- List of works by Giovanni Bellini
