= Ex-voto =

Votive offering to a saint or to a divinity in Christianity

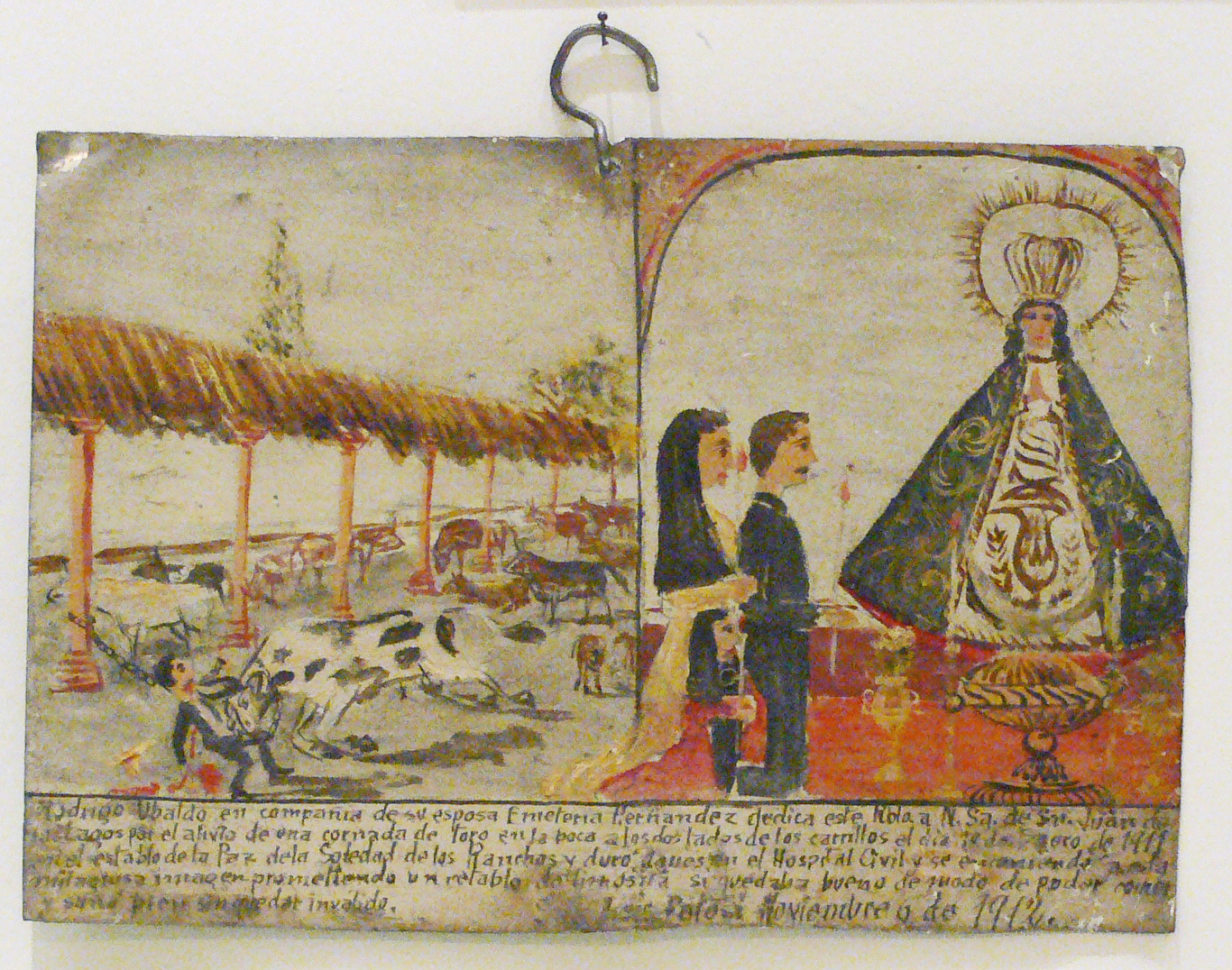
Mexican votive painting of 1911; the man survived an attack by a bull, attributed to the care of Our Lady of San Juan de los Lagos

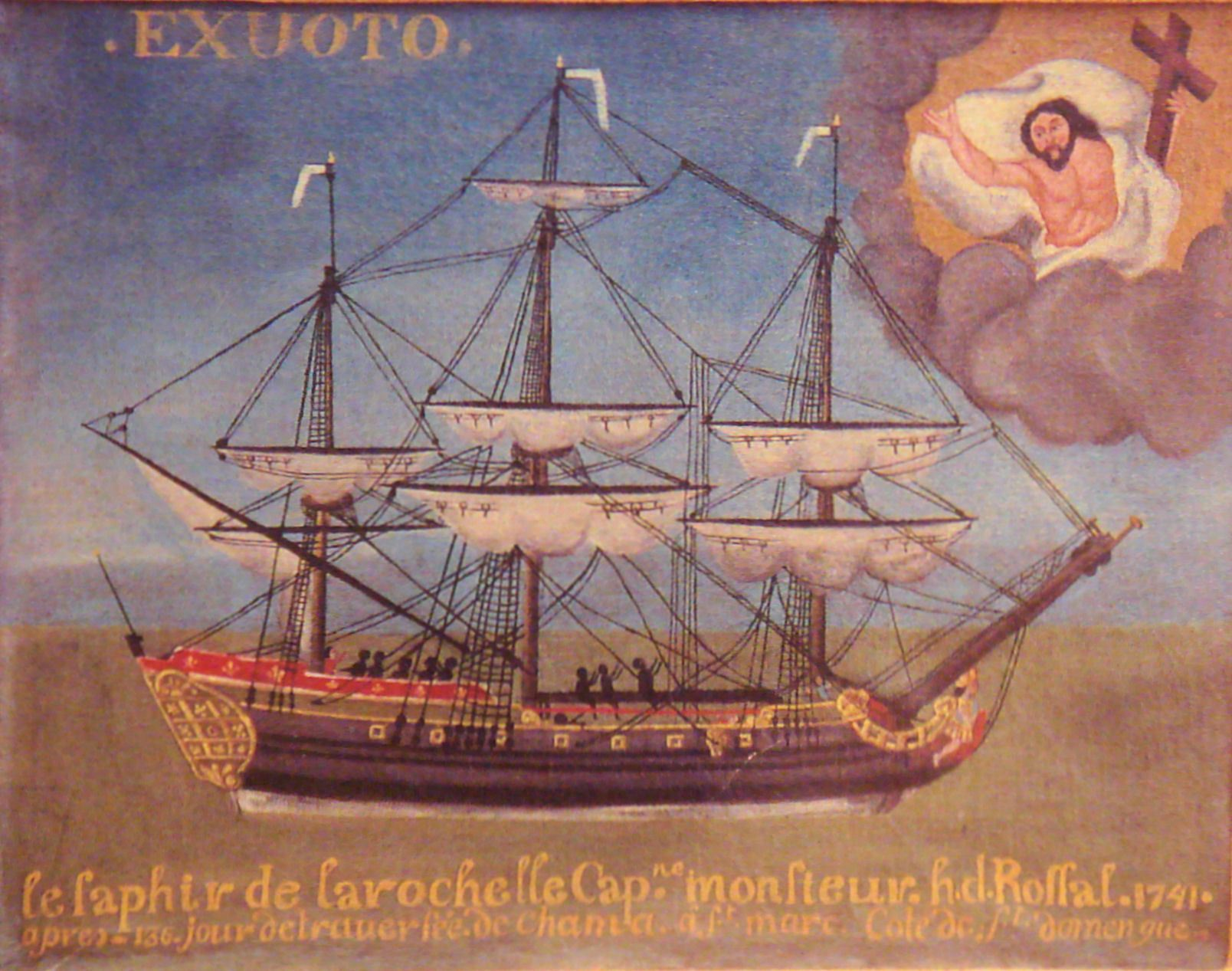
La Rochelle slave ship Le saphir, ex-voto in the Saint Louis Cathedral in La Rochelle, 1741

An ex-voto is a votive offering to a saint or a divinity, given in fulfillment of a vow (hence the Latin term, short for ex voto suscepto, "from the vow made") or in gratitude or devotion. The term is usually restricted to Christian examples.

== Definition ==
Ex-votos are placed in a church or chapel where the worshiper seeks grace or wishes to give thanks. The destinations of pilgrimages often include shrines decorated with ex-votos.

Ex-votos can take a wide variety of forms. They are not only intended for the invocated, but also as a testimony to later visitors of the received help. As such they may include texts explaining a miracle attributed to the helper, or symbols such as a painted or modeled reproduction of a miraculously healed body part, or a directly related item such as a crutch given by a person formerly lame. There are places where a very old tradition of depositing ex-votos existed, such as Abydos in ancient Egypt.

== Ex-voto paintings ==
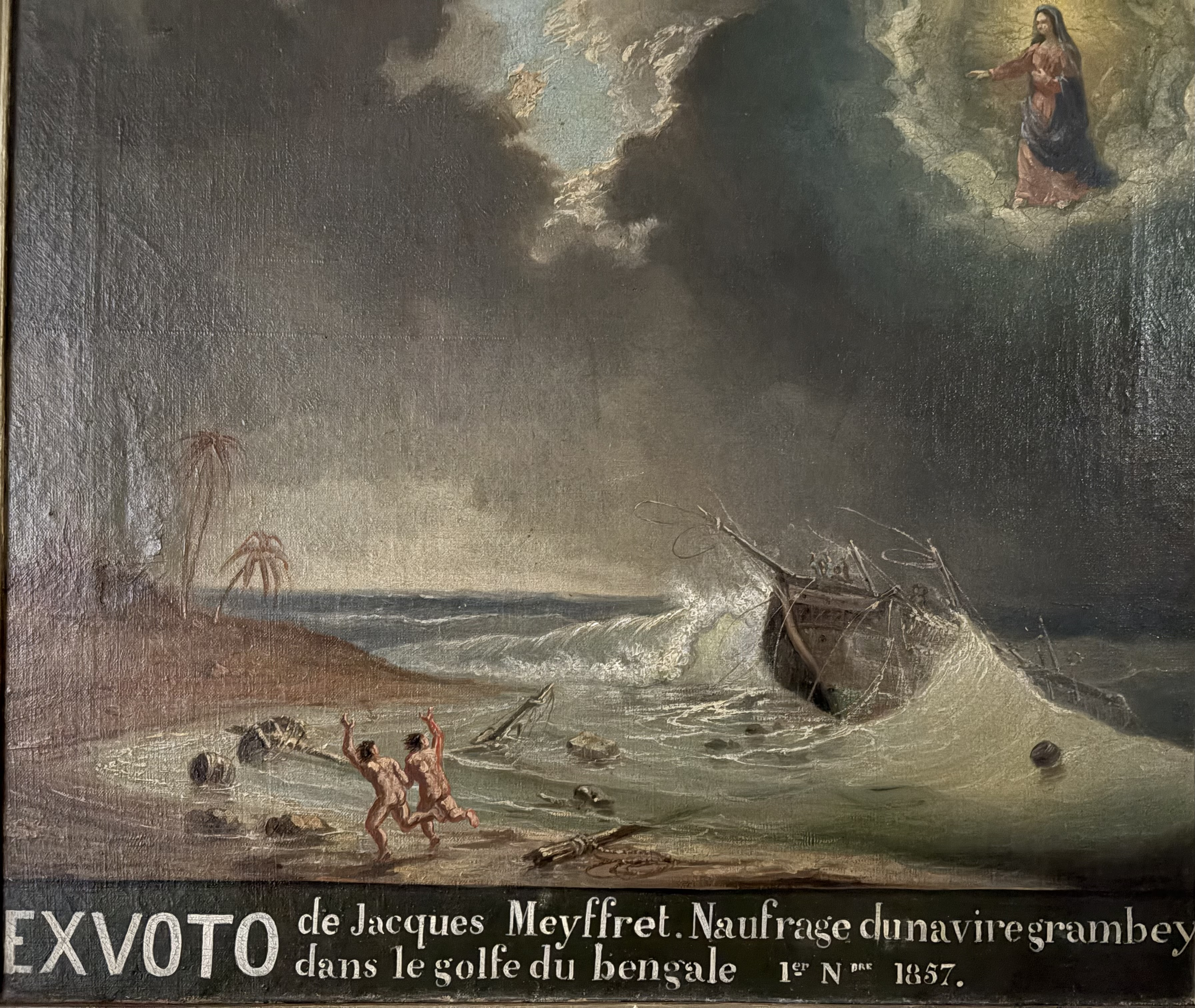
Ex-voto in the church of Notre Dame de la Garoupe, Antibes, France. It thanks Notre Dame de Bon Port for her help during a shipwreck in the Bay of Bengal in 1857.

Especially in the Latin world, there is a tradition of votive paintings, typically depicting a dangerous incident which the offeror survived. The votive paintings of Mexico are paralleled in other countries. In Italy, where more than 15,000 ex-voto paintings are thought to survive from before 1600, these began to appear in the 1490s, probably modelled on the small predella panels below altarpieces. These are a form of folk art, in Mexico typically painted cheaply on tin plates salvaged from packaging.

Other examples may be large and grand paintings, such as Titian's Jacopo Pesaro being presented by Pope Alexander VI to Saint Peter, given in thanks for a naval victory. In Venice it became the custom in the Renaissance for the higher officials, beginning with the Doge, to commission (at their personal expense) an ex-voto painting in the form of a portrait of themselves with religious figures, usually the Virgin or saints, in thanks for achieving their office. For lower officials only their coat of arms might represent the official. The painting was hung in the public building where they worked or presided. An example is the Barbarigo Altarpiece, a votive portrait of Doge Agostino Barbarigo with the Virgin and Child, two saints and assorted angels, by Giovanni Bellini (1488). This was made for the Doge's Palace but is now in San Pietro Martire, Murano.

The Ex-Voto de 1662 is a painting by Philippe de Champaigne (now Louvre), showing two nuns, one of whom recovered from serious illness.

== Examples ==
In the church of Notre-Dame de la Garde in Marseille, France, the site of a major local pilgrimage, the ex-votos include paintings, plaques, model ships, war medals and even football shirts given by players and supporters of Olympique de Marseille, the local team. The magnificent Lod mosaic is thought to be an ex-voto expressing gratitude for rescue from a shipwreck. In the long Votive Chapel of Saint Joseph's Oratory in Montreal, there are fixed on iron grilles hundreds of crutches, canes and braces left behind by pilgrims who claimed to have received a healing while meeting with Brother André, CSC. Pope Benedict XVI recognized the authenticity of the miracles and canonized Saint André Bessette in 2011.

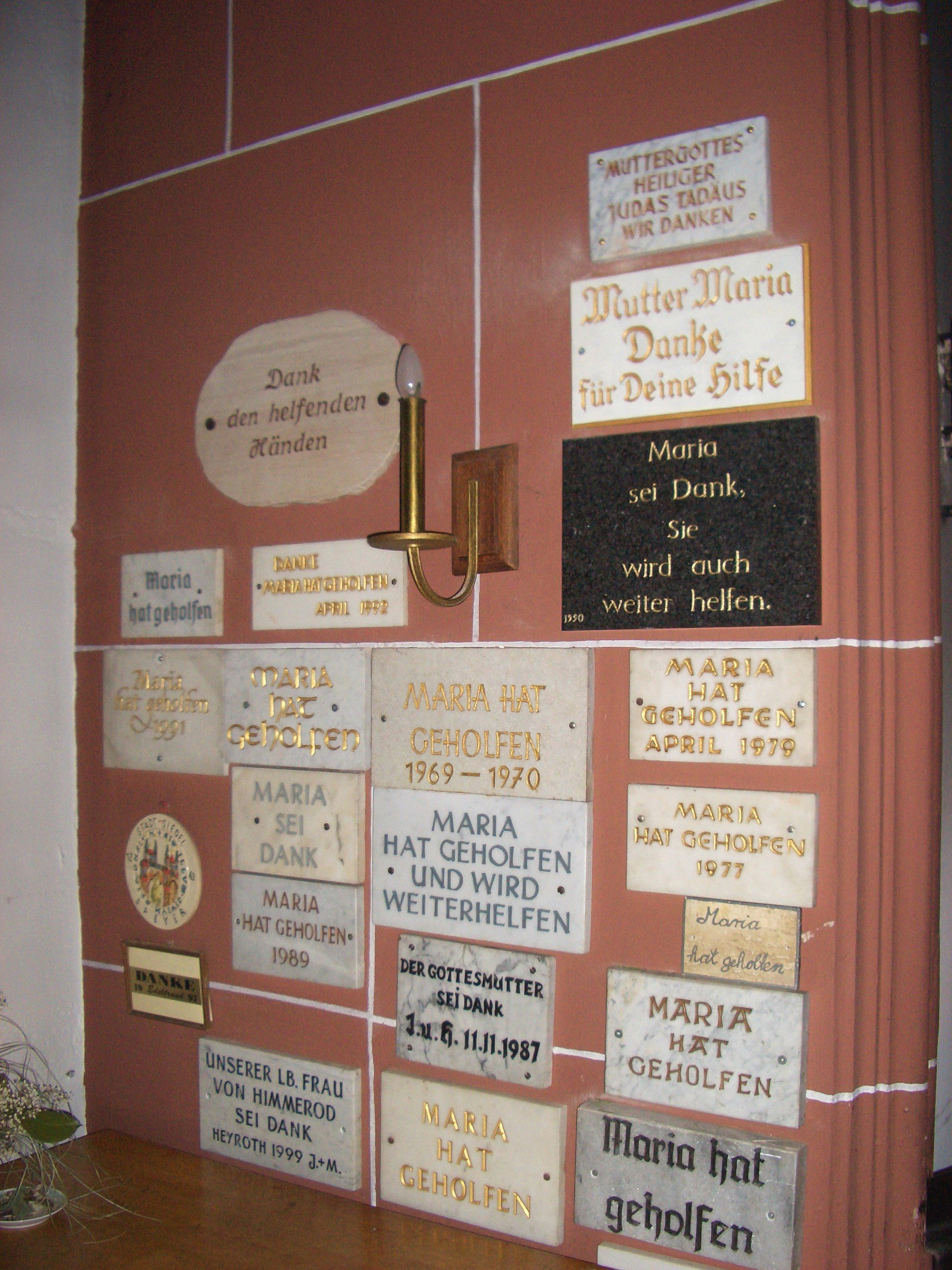
Votive tablets to Saint Mary in Himmerod Abbey, Germany

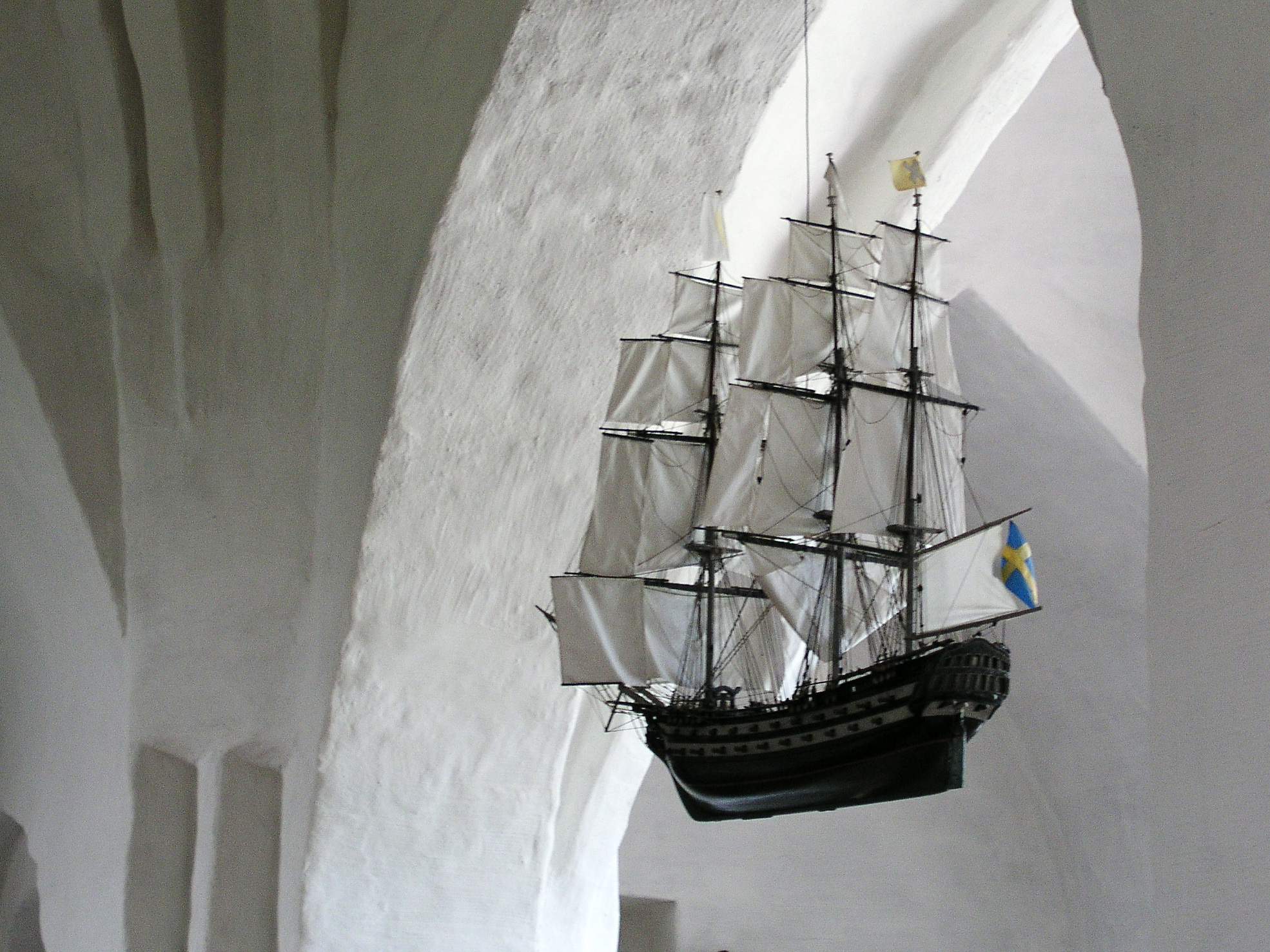
A votive ship (probably expressing thanks for help during a storm) hanging in a Söderköping church

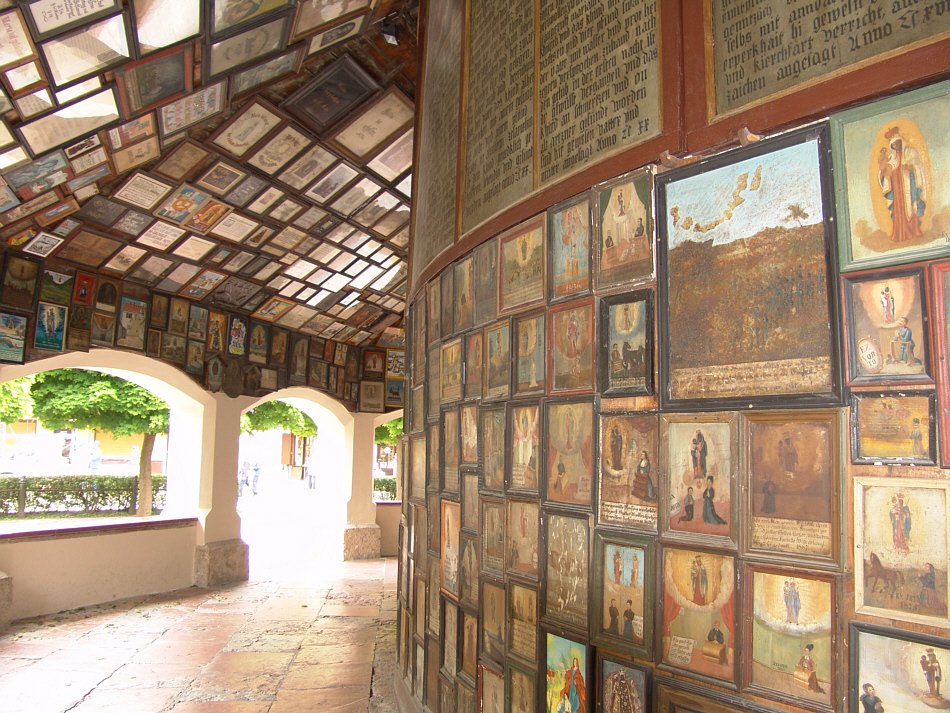
Votive paintings in the Shrine of Our Lady of Altötting, Bavaria

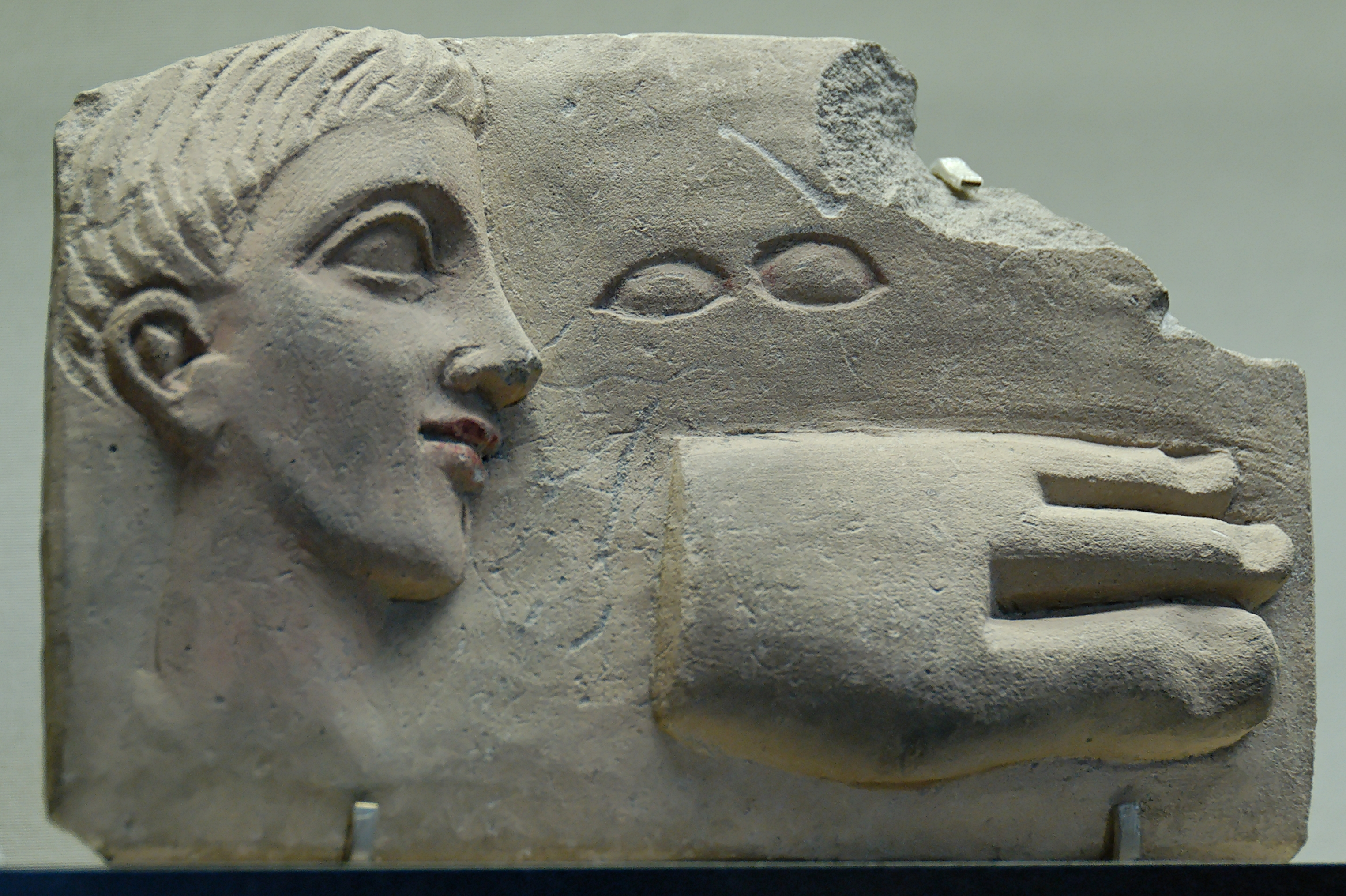
Several body parts in a Cypriot plaque from the Roman age

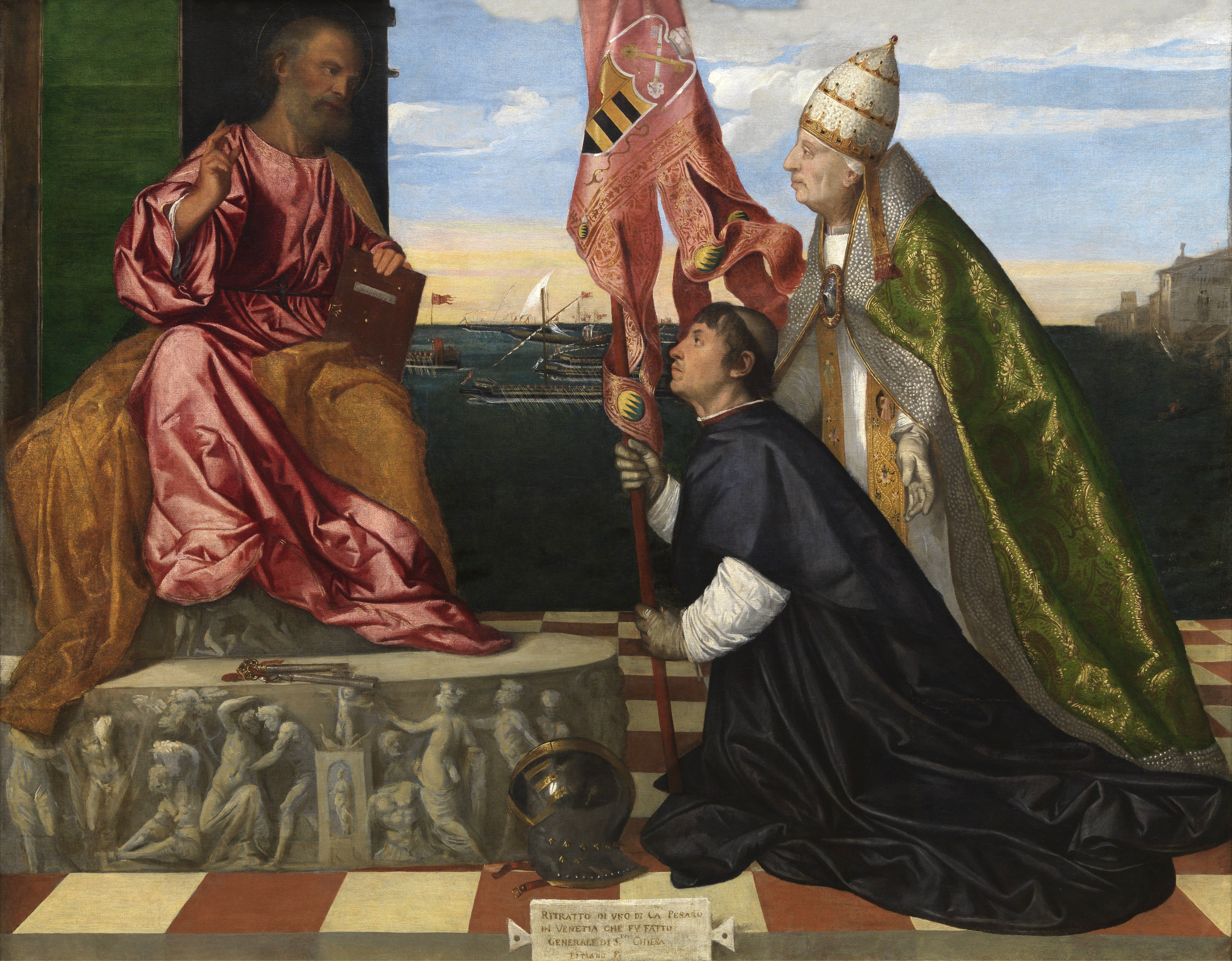
Jacopo Pesaro being presented by Pope Alexander VI to Saint Peter, ex-voto painting by Titian

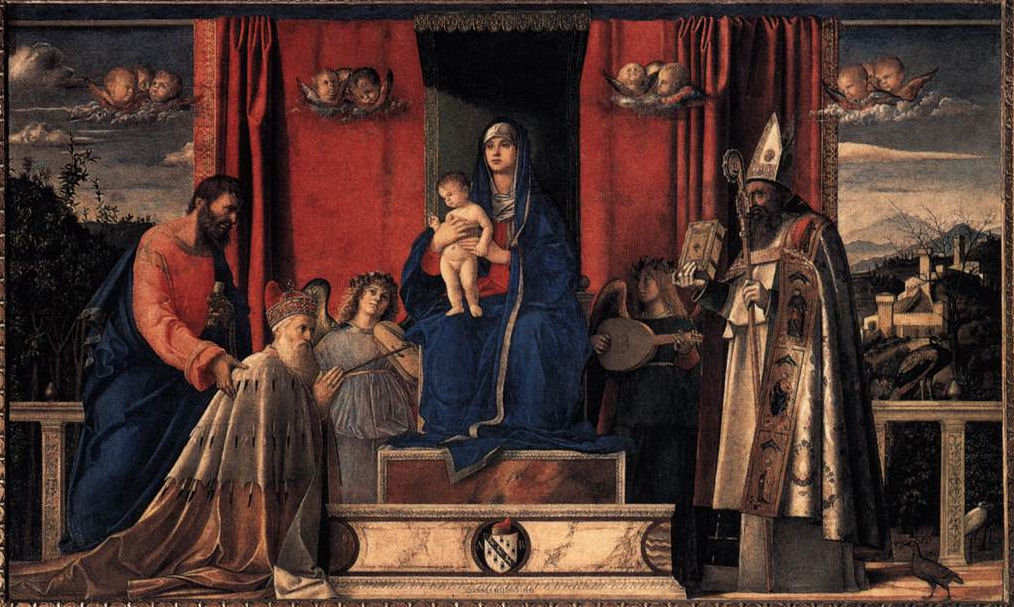
The Barbarigo Altarpiece: Doge Agostino Barbarigo with the Virgin and Child, by Giovanni Bellini, an ex-voto for the Doge's Palace

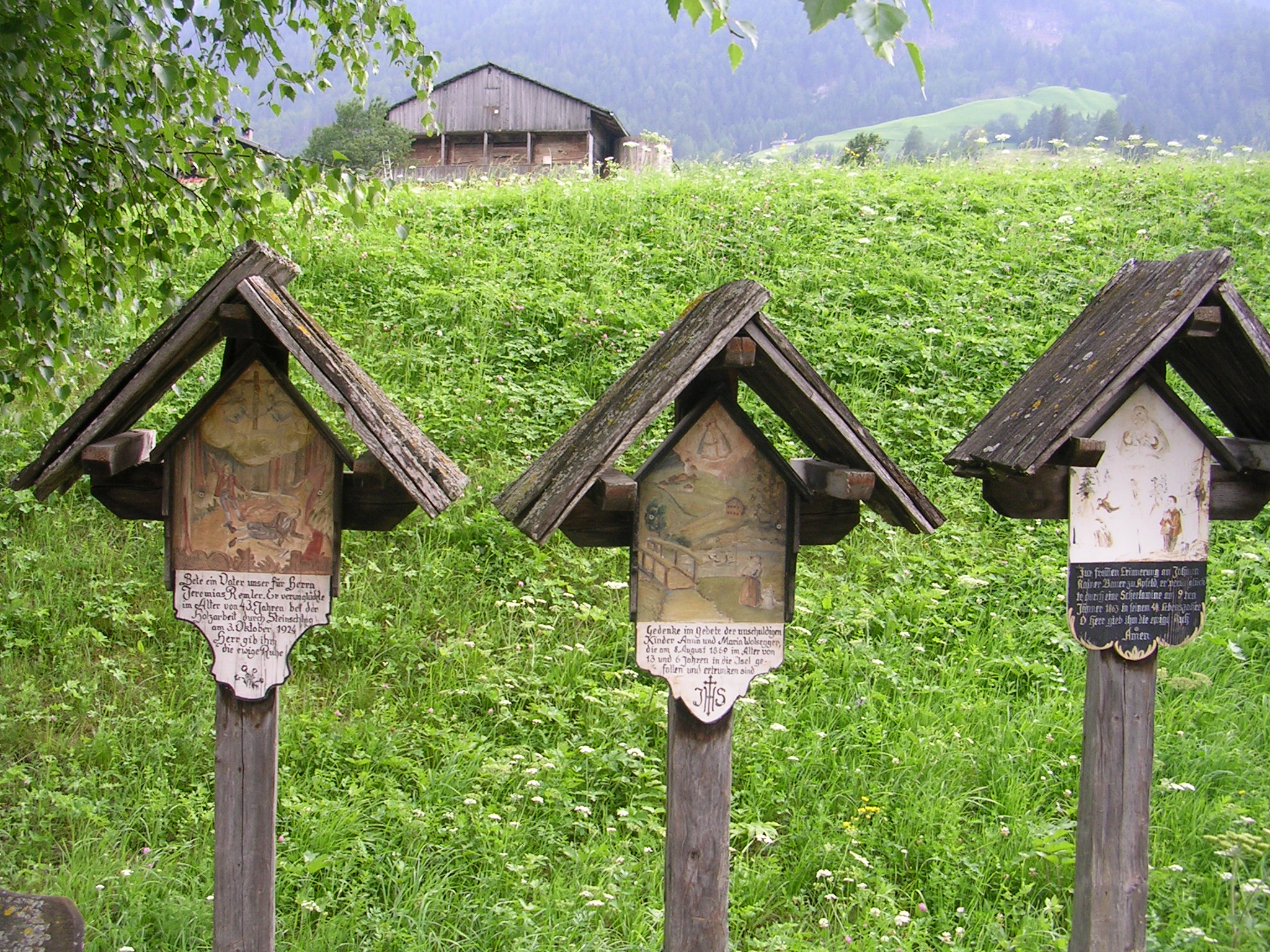
Roadside ex-voto plaques, Ganz, East Tirol

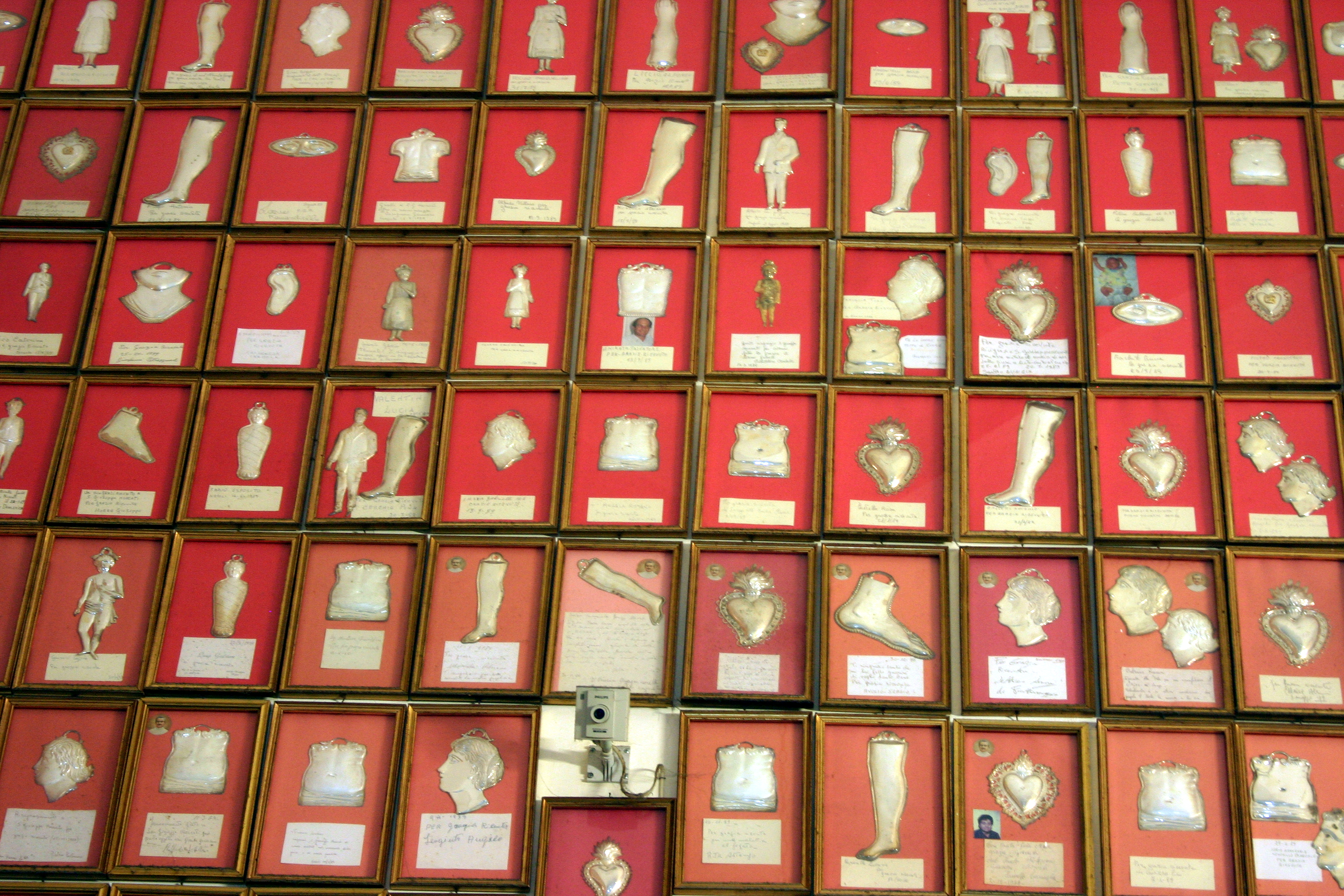
Metal ex-votos in Gesù Nuovo, Naples

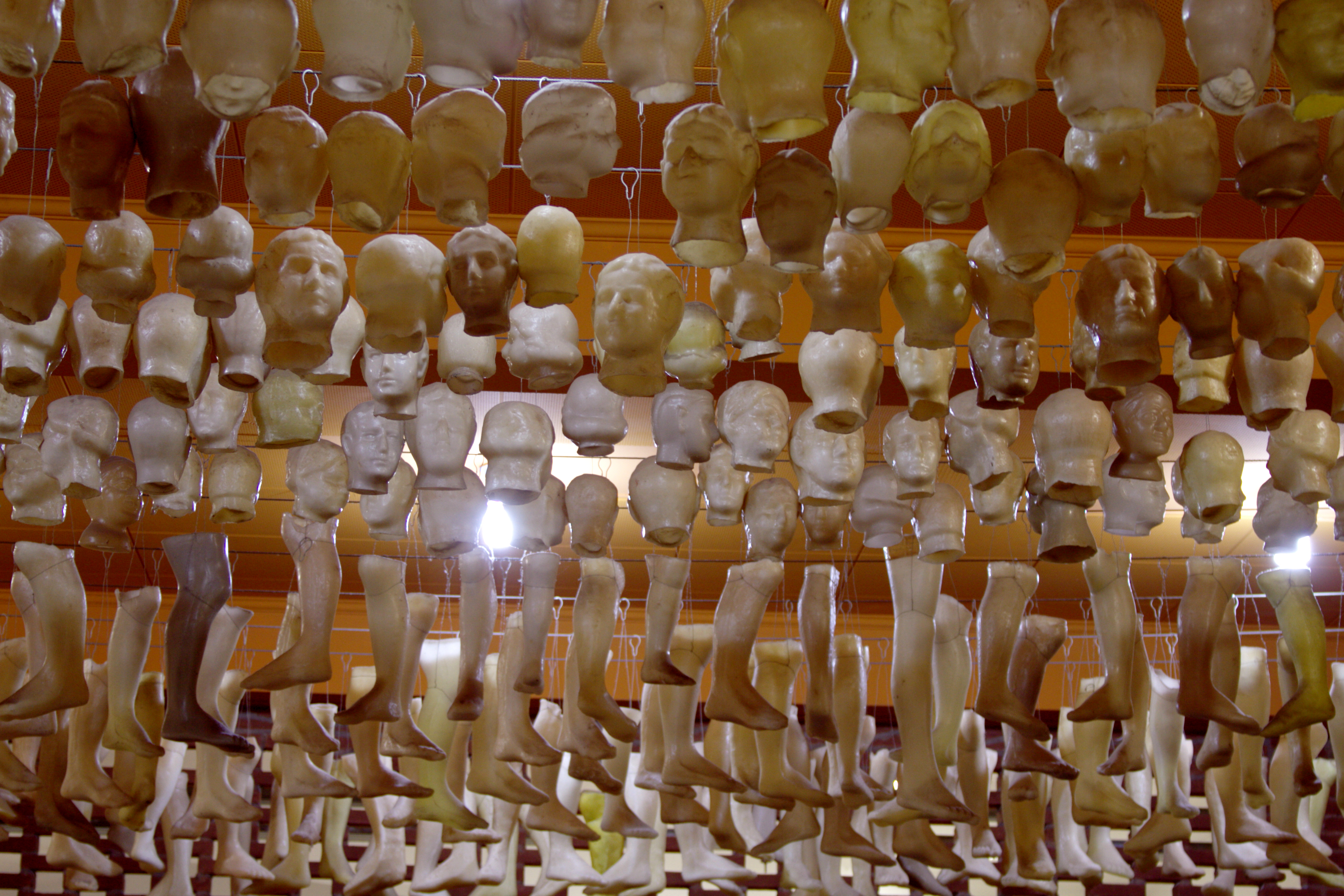
Ex-votos in the Basilica of Our Lady of Aparecida, Brazil

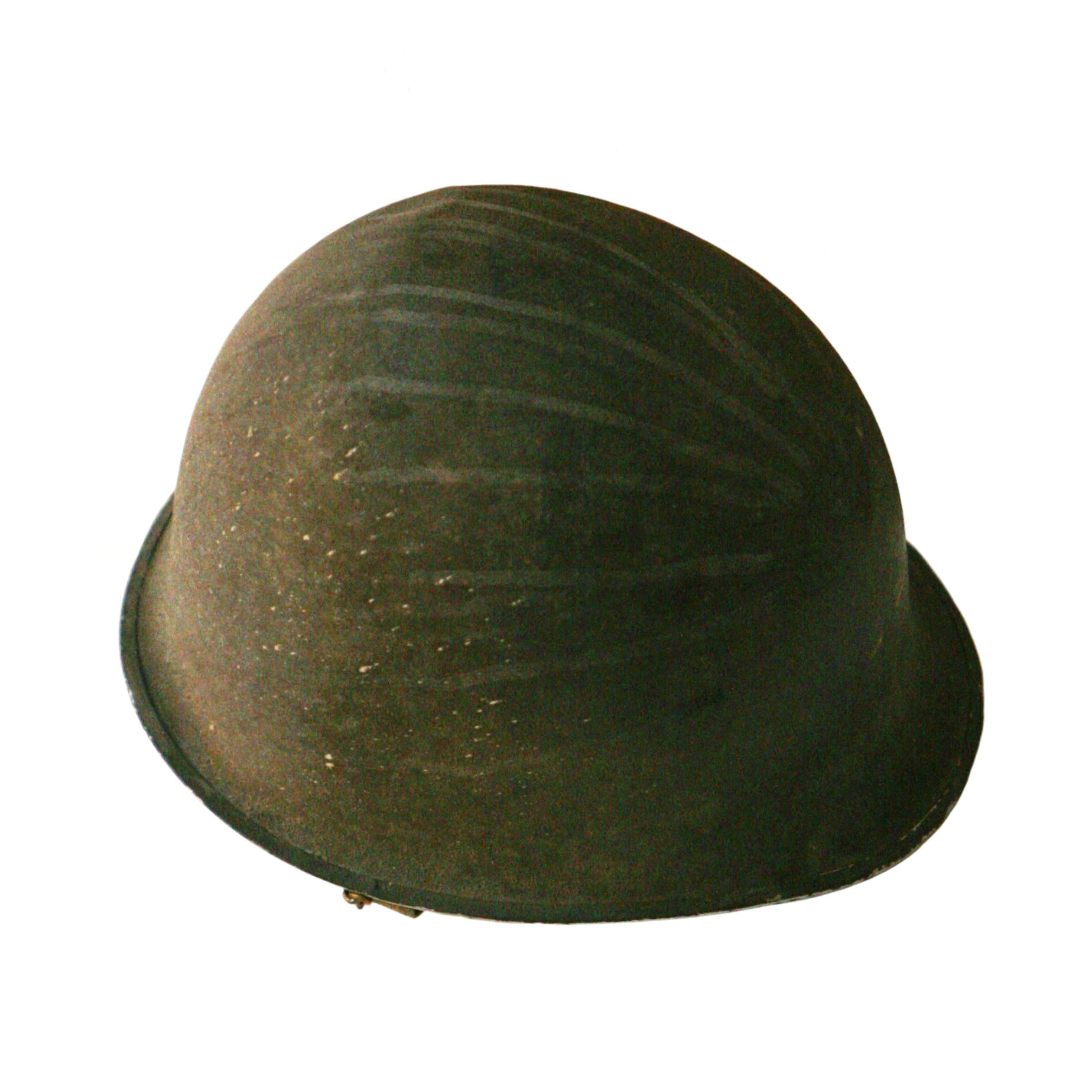
M1 helmet of the French Army on display as an ex-voto at Notre-Dame de la Garde in Marseille. The back of the helmet is slightly bent, suggesting that it was hit by a shrapnel and saved its owner.

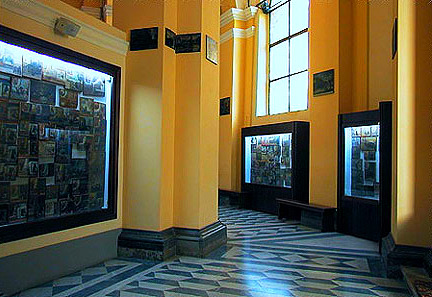
Ex-votos in the Abbey of St Maria del Monte, Cesena, Italy

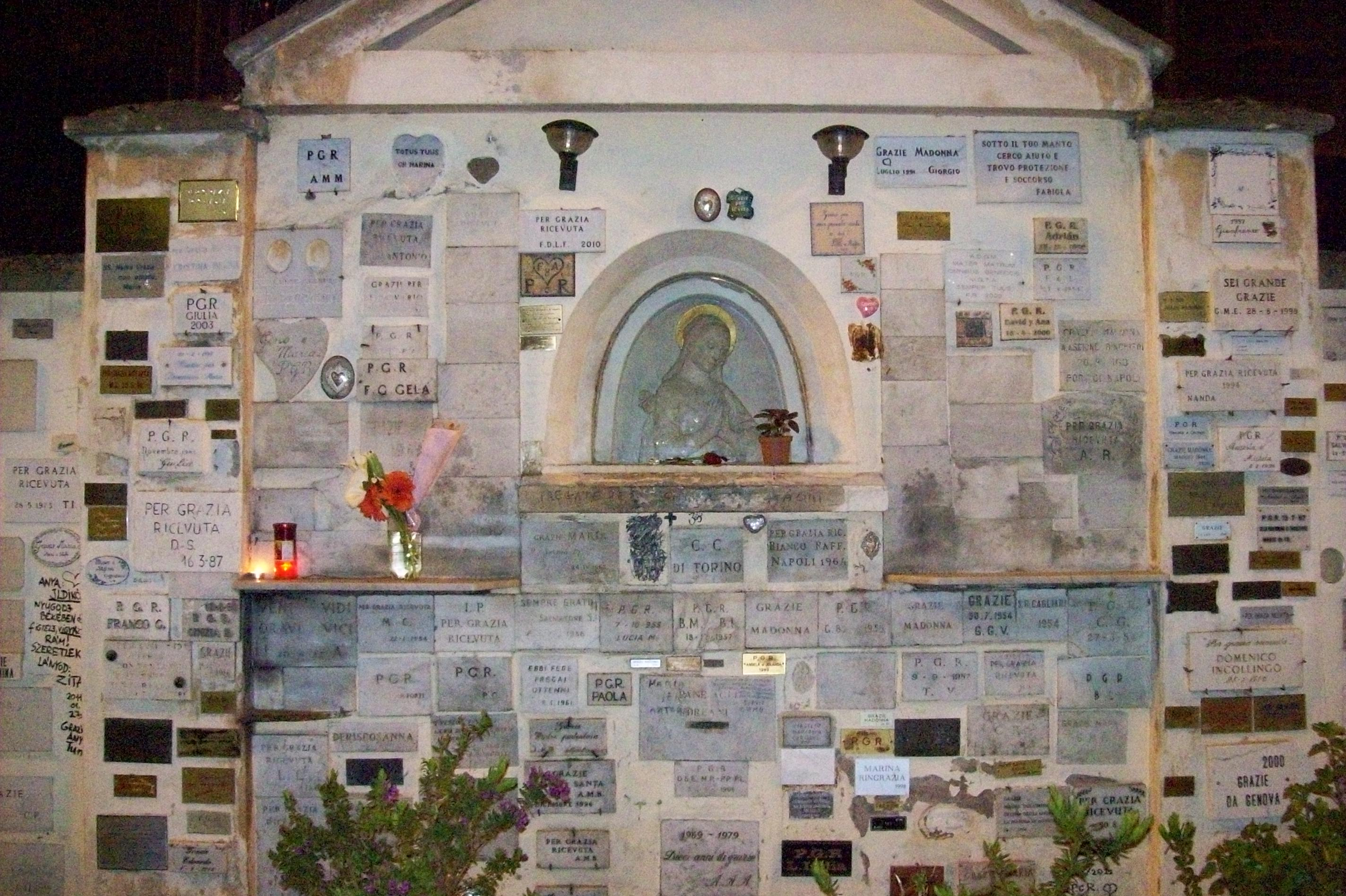
Ex-voto plaques on a wall at the Roman Viale Trastevere

== See also ==
- Pinax
- Tama (votive)
- Votive candle
- Milagro (votive)
