= Virgin in Glory with Saints =

Painting by Giovanni Bellini

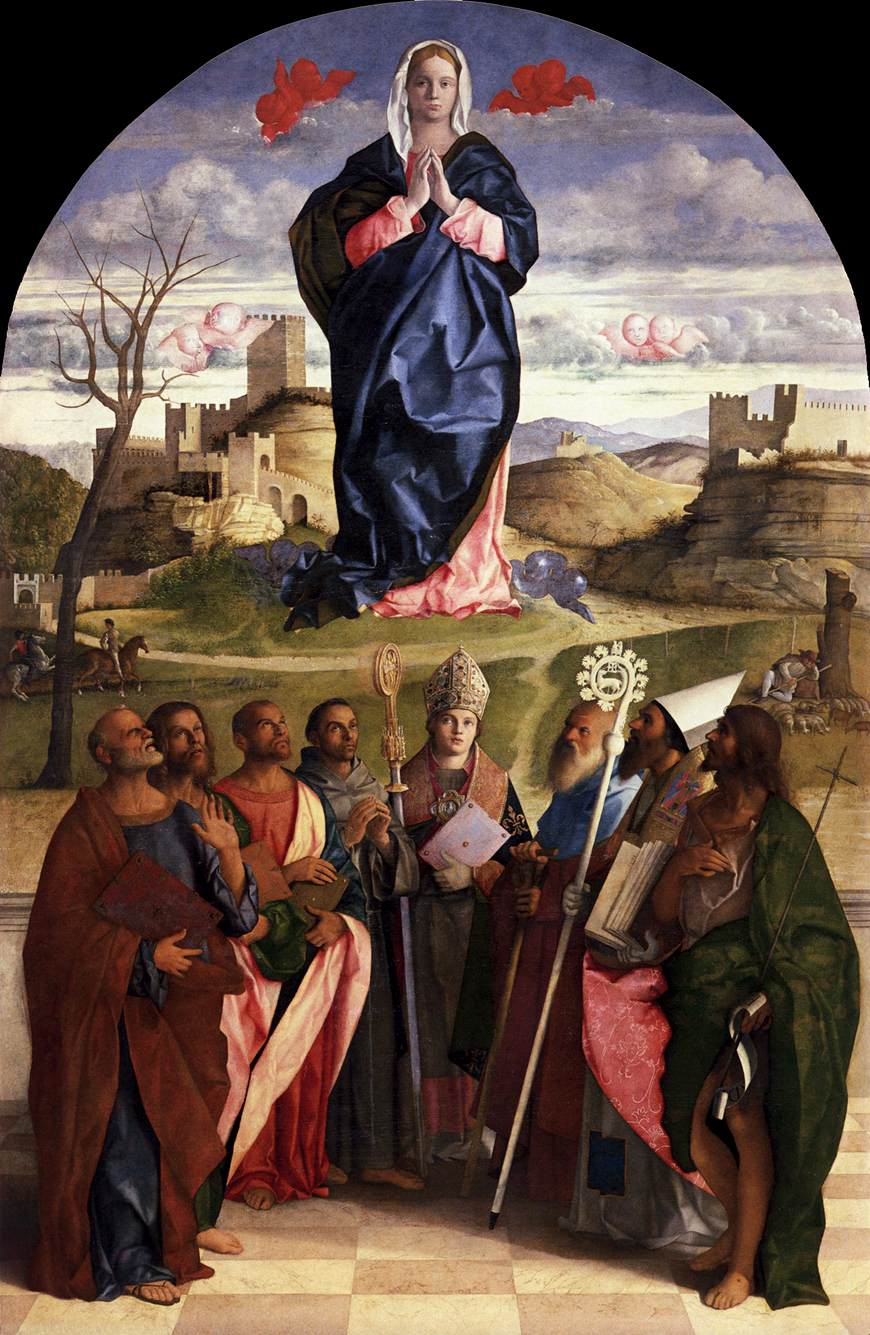
Virgin in Glory

Virgin in Glory with Saints is an oil painting on panel executed ca. 1510–1515 by the Italian Renaissance master Giovanni Bellini and probably also his studio, now in the Gallerie dell'Accademia in Venice. It measures 3.5 m by 2.25 m and shows the Assumption of Mary, which is usually shown witnessed by the apostles; here it is instead seen by (from left to right) Saint Mark, John the Evangelist, Saint Luke, Francis of Assisi with the stigmata, Louis of Toulouse as a young bishop, Anthony the Great, Augustine of Hippo and John the Baptist.

Its similarities to Lorenzo Lotto's slightly earlier Asolo Altarpiece reveal that the elderly Bellini was still learning from younger artists. The painting was originally produced for the Santa Maria degli Angeli in Murano and was later transferred to the nearby San Pietro Martire and finally to its present home.

== See also ==
- List of works by Giovanni Bellini
