= Giovanni Agostino da Lodi =

Italian painter

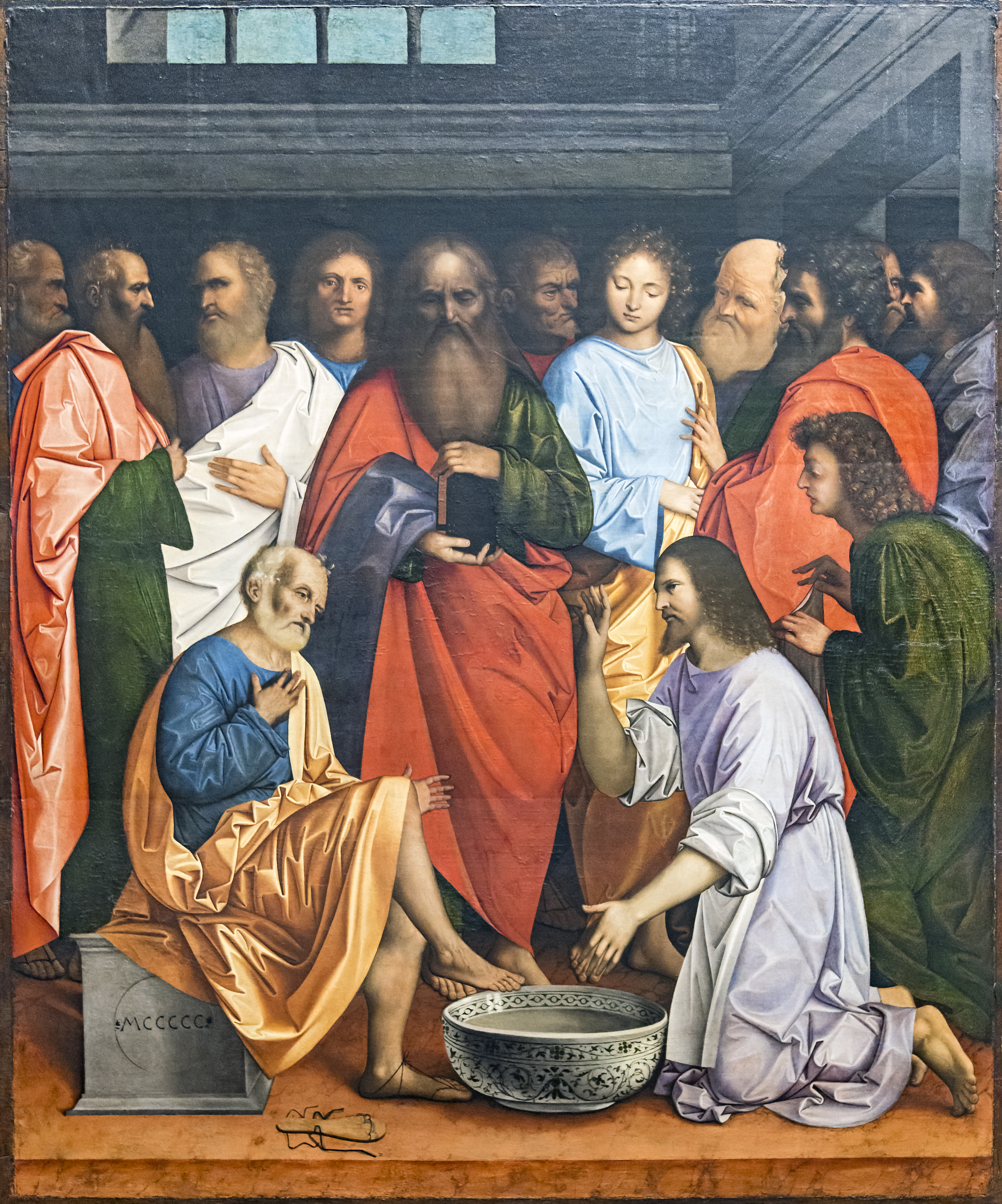
Christ Washing the Feet of the Apostles (1500). Gallerie dell'Accademia, Venice.

Giovanni Agostino da Lodi was an Italian painter who was active from c. 1495 to c. 1525.

The attribution of his works has been dubious for centuries, until his style and career was defined by the American art historian Bernard Berenson. One of his first identified work is the Pala dei Barcaioli ("Boatmen Altarpiece") in the church of San Pietro Martire at Murano. His only signed work is the St. Peter and St. John the Evangelist in the Pinacoteca di Brera, which shows Lombard influences, such as that of Bramantino.

Later he was also influenced by Leonardo da Vinci's style, as visible in the Christ Washing the Feet of the Apostles in the Gallerie dell'Accademia of Venice. After moving to Venice in the wake of Ludovico Sforza's fall, he returned to Milan in 1506. He subsequently executed works for private commissions and for the Certosa di Pavia. One of his late works, the Calvary, is housed in the National Gallery in Prague. He also collaborated with Marco d'Oggiono on a polyptych in the church of Santa Maria della Pace in Milan, some panels of which are now in the Pinacoteca di Brera.

== Gallery ==
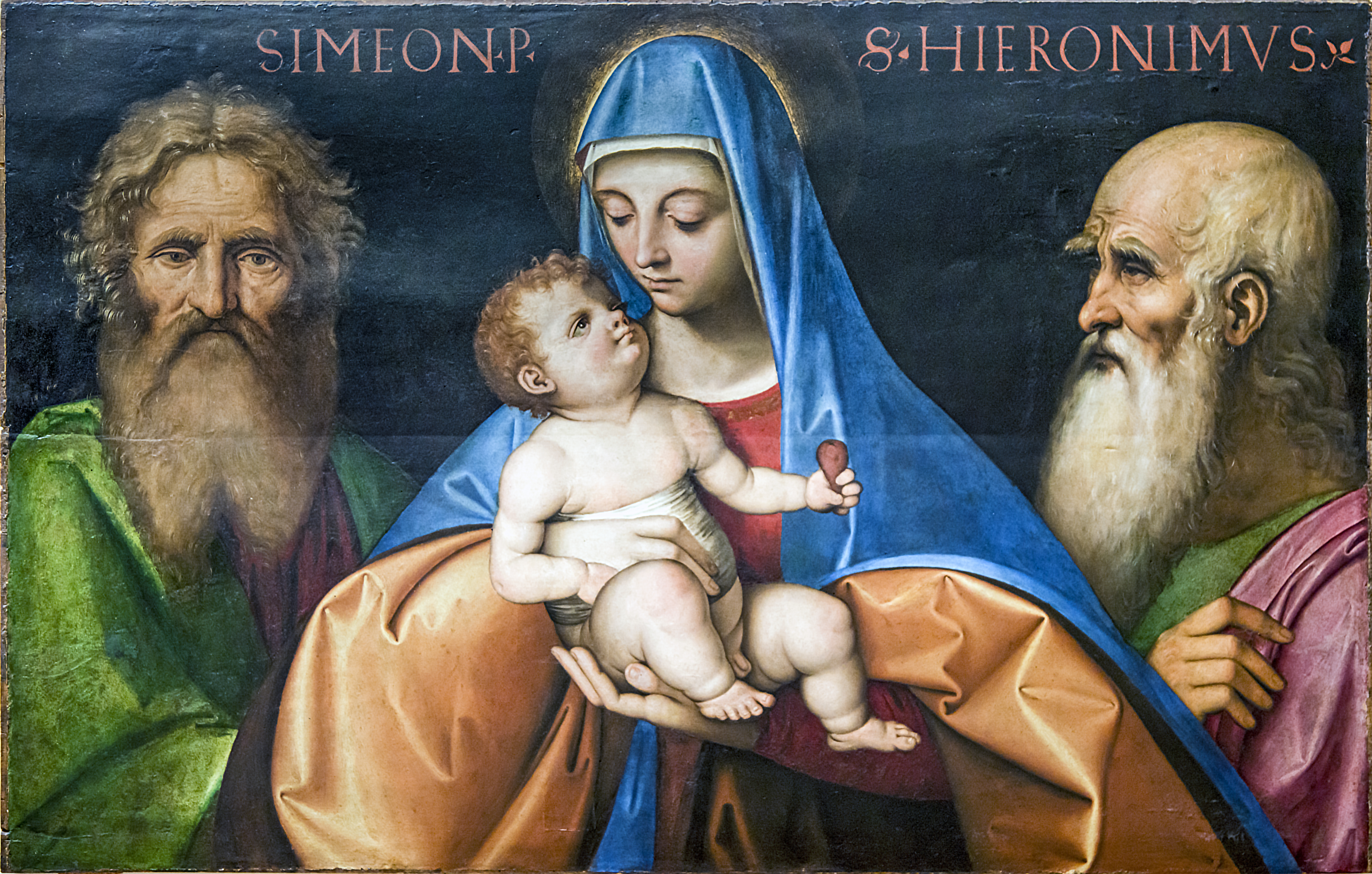
Madonna with the Child with Saint Simeon and Saint Hieronymus

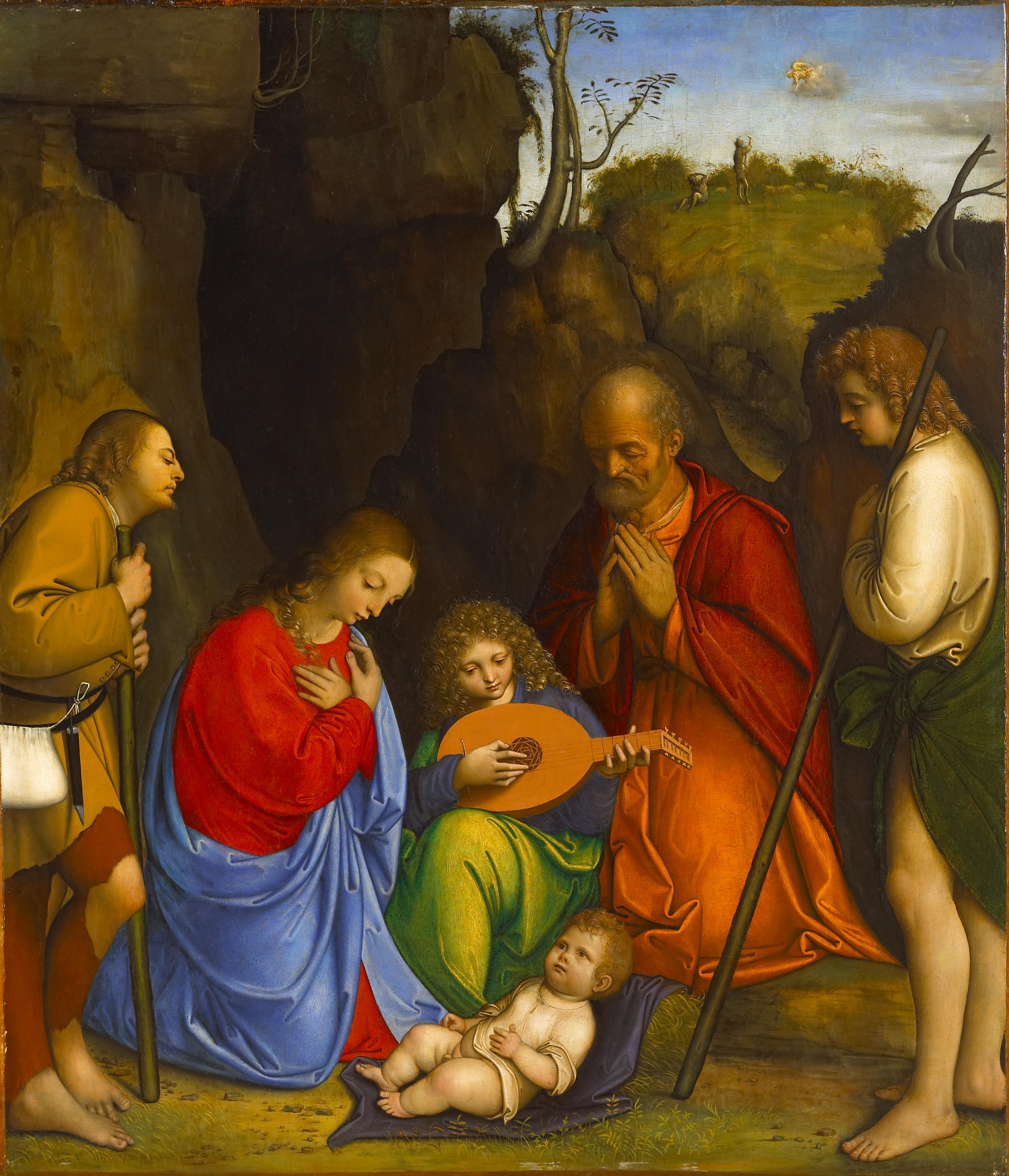
The Adoration of the Shepherds (after 1510)

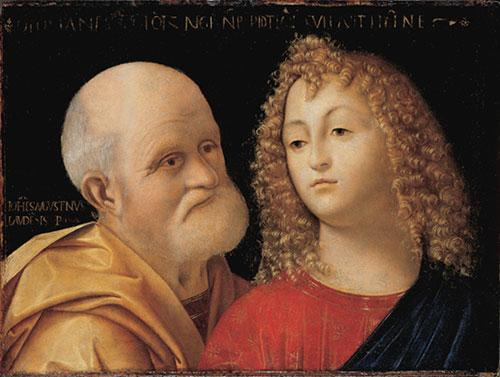
The Teacher and the Young Pupil

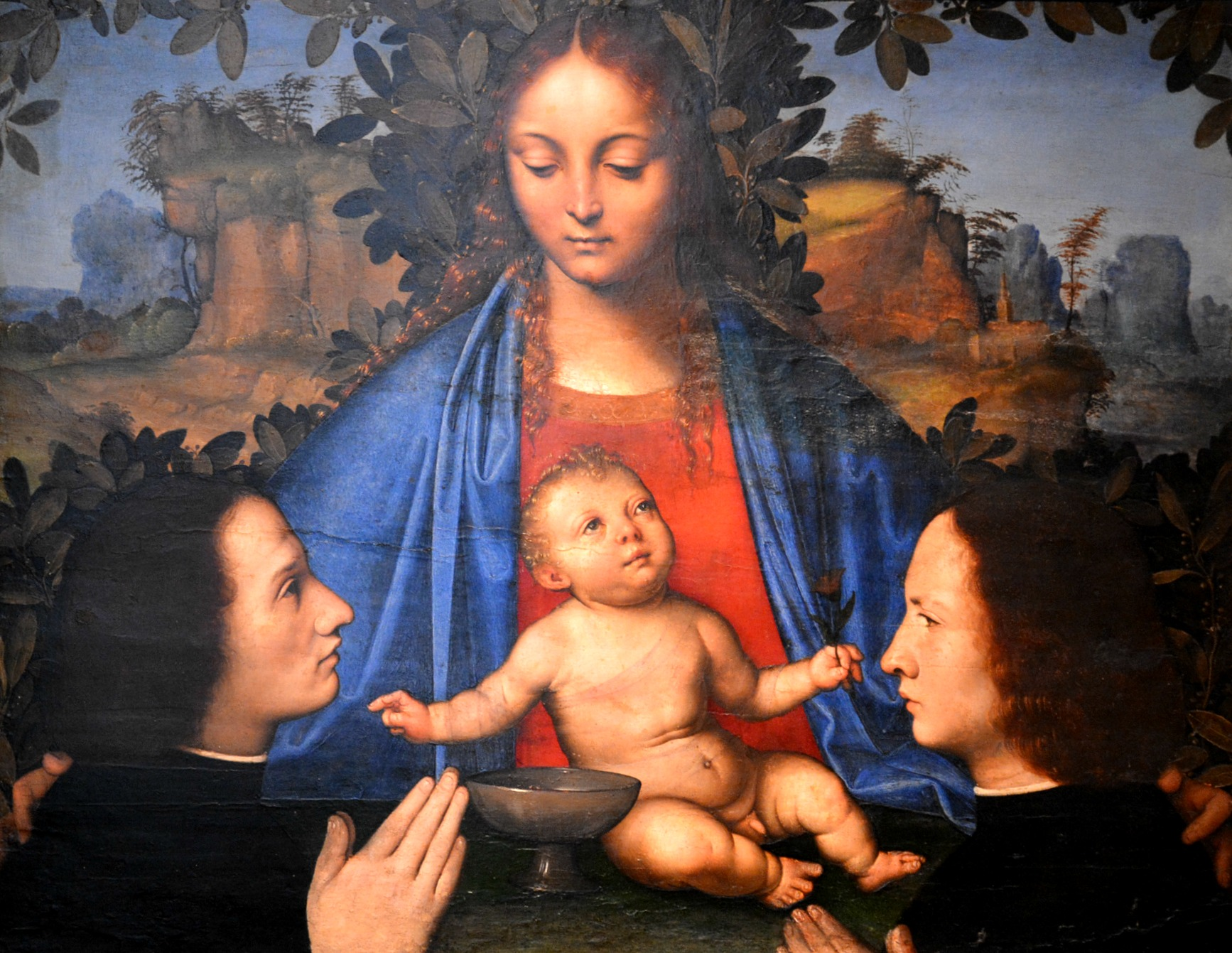
Madonna and Child with Devotees

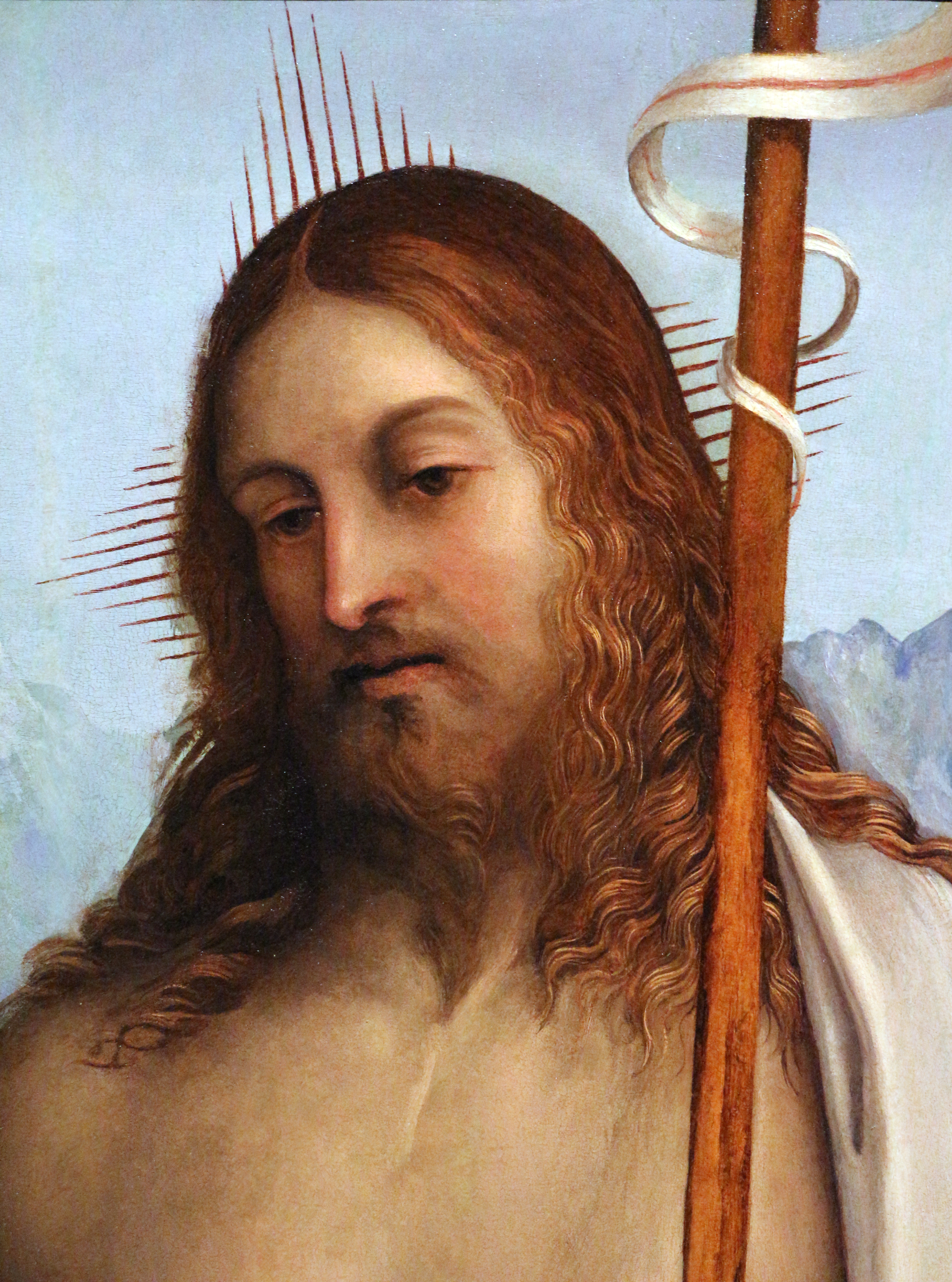
Risen Christ (c. 1515–20)

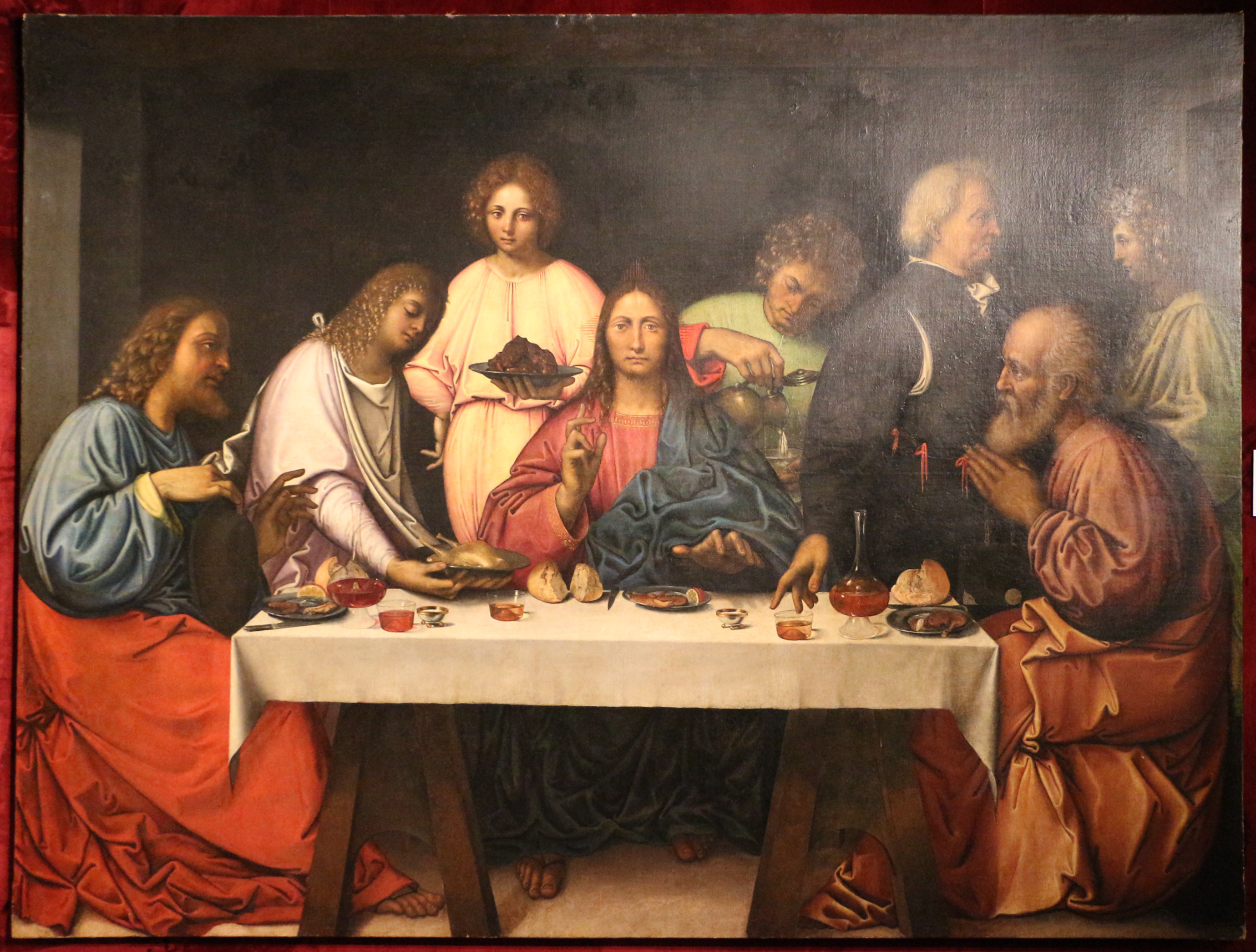
Dinner in Emmaus

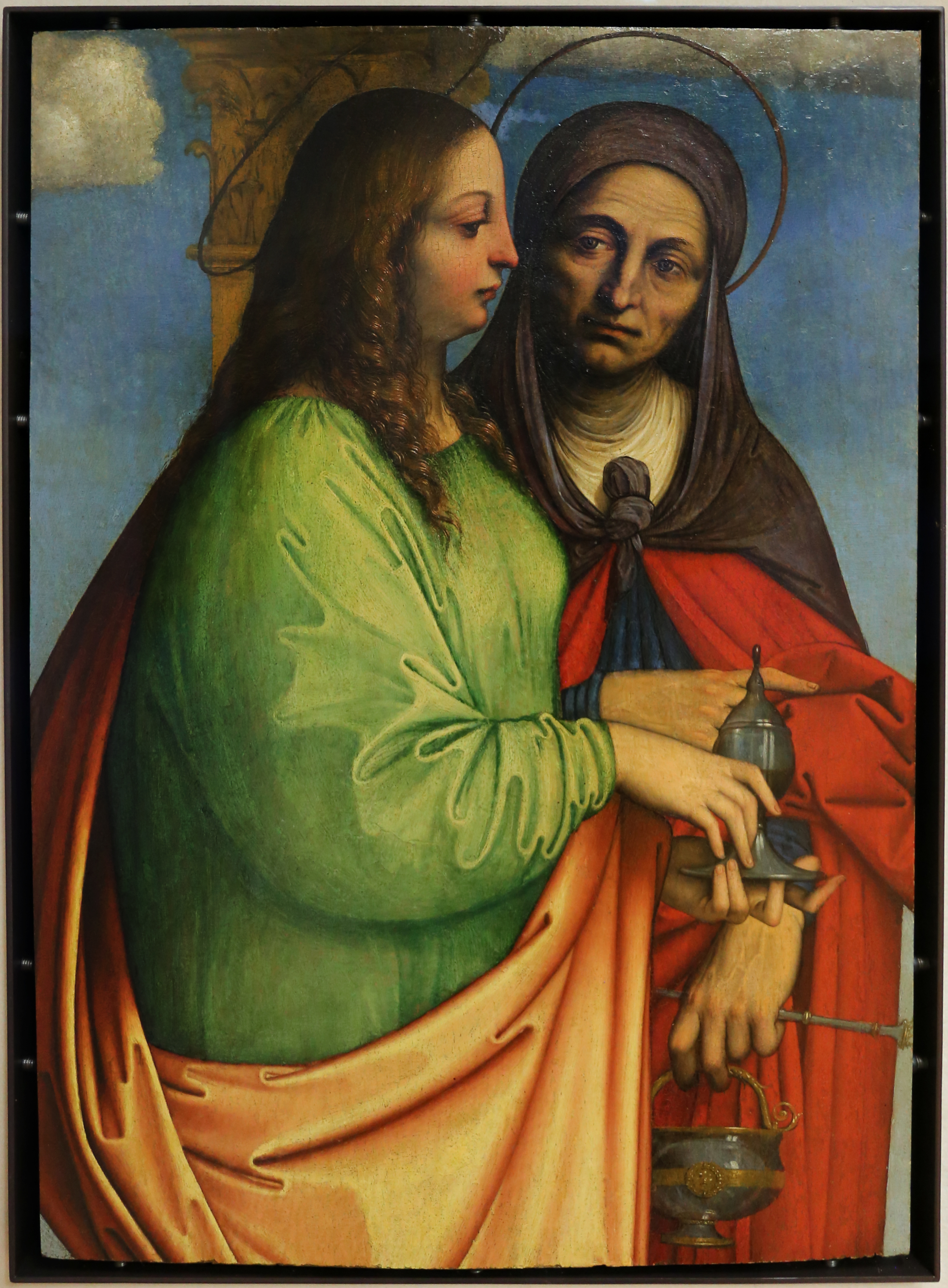
Saint Martha and Saint Magdalene, Castelvecchio Museum

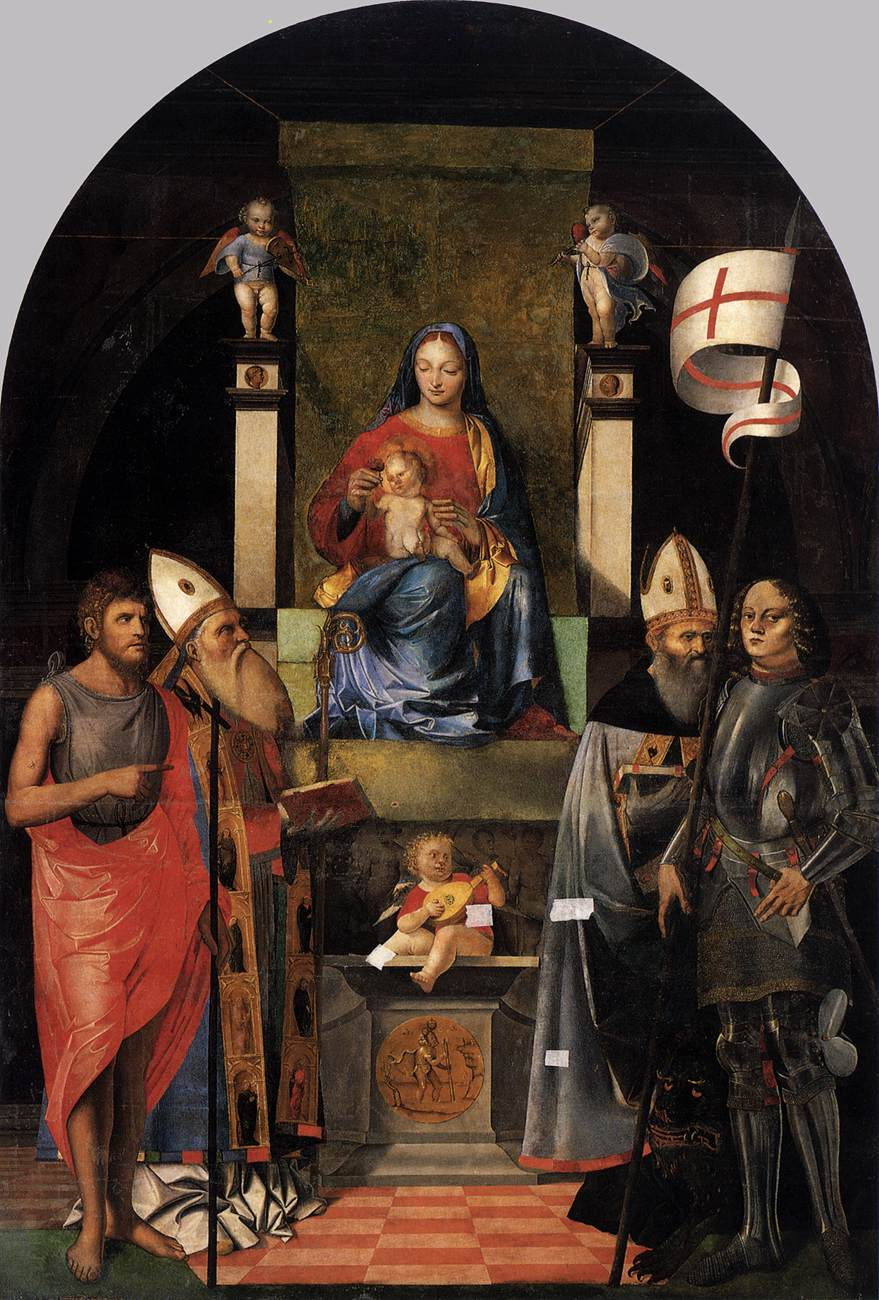
Virgin and Child Enthroned with Saints (1492)

== Sources ==
- I Leonardeschi: l'eredità di Leonardo in Lombardia. Milan. 1998.
