= San Pietro Martire, Murano =

Parish church in Murano, Italy

Church of St. Peter Martyr
- San Pietro Martire
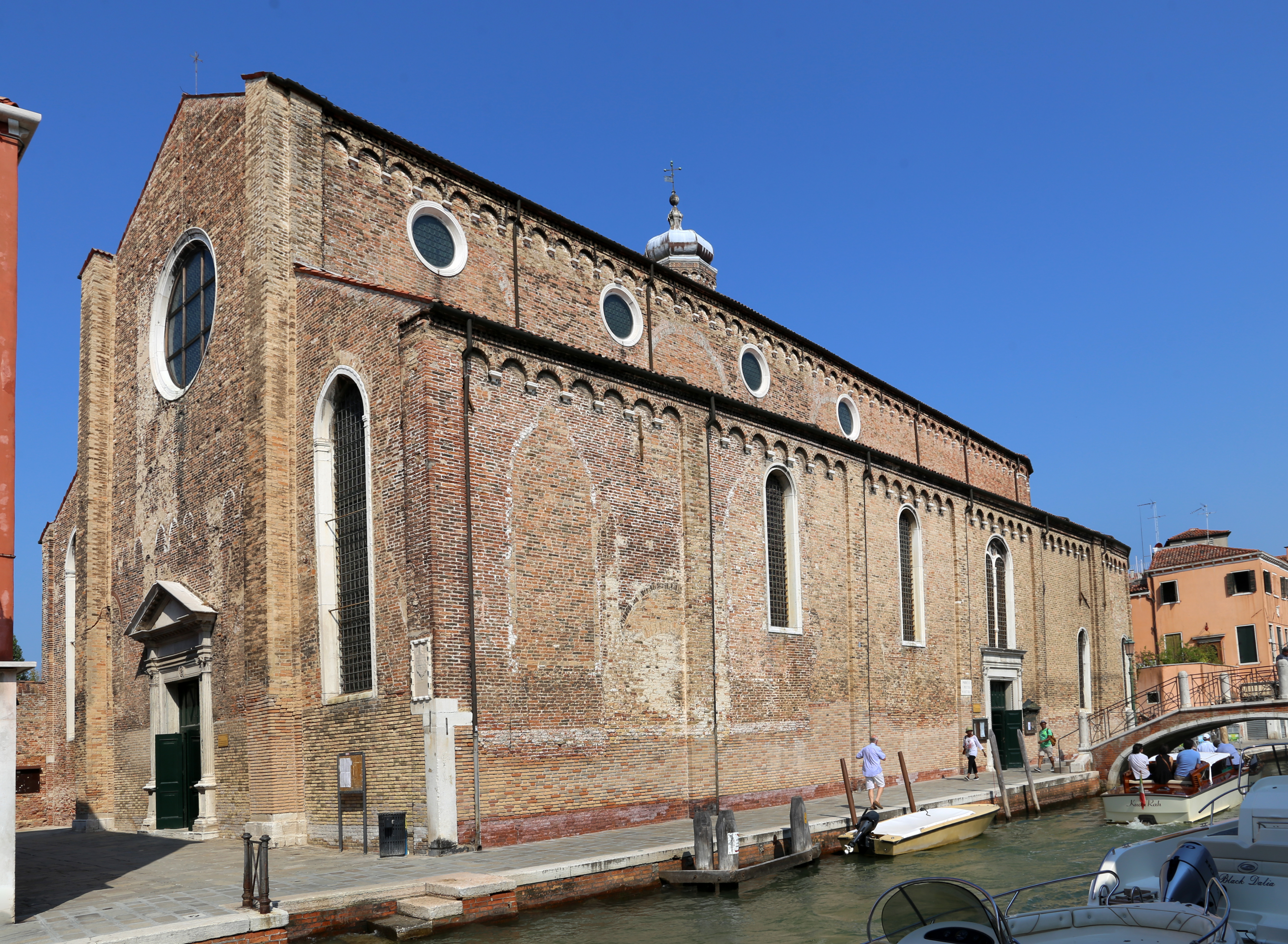
- Façade of San Pietro Martire.

- Location within Italy

Religion
- Affiliation: Roman Catholic
- Province: Patriarchate of Venice
- Ecclesiastical or organisational status: Parish

Location
- Location: Venice, Italy
- Coordinates: 45°27′18.5″N 12°21′9.4″E

Architecture
- Type: Church
- Style: Renaissance
- Groundbreaking: 1348 (started: 1474)
- Completed: 1511

Specifications
- Length: 55 metres (180 ft)
- Width: 25 metres (82 ft)
- Width (nave): 13 metres (43 ft)

San Pietro Martire (English: St. Peter Martyr) is a Roman catholic parish church in Murano, near Venice, northern Italy.

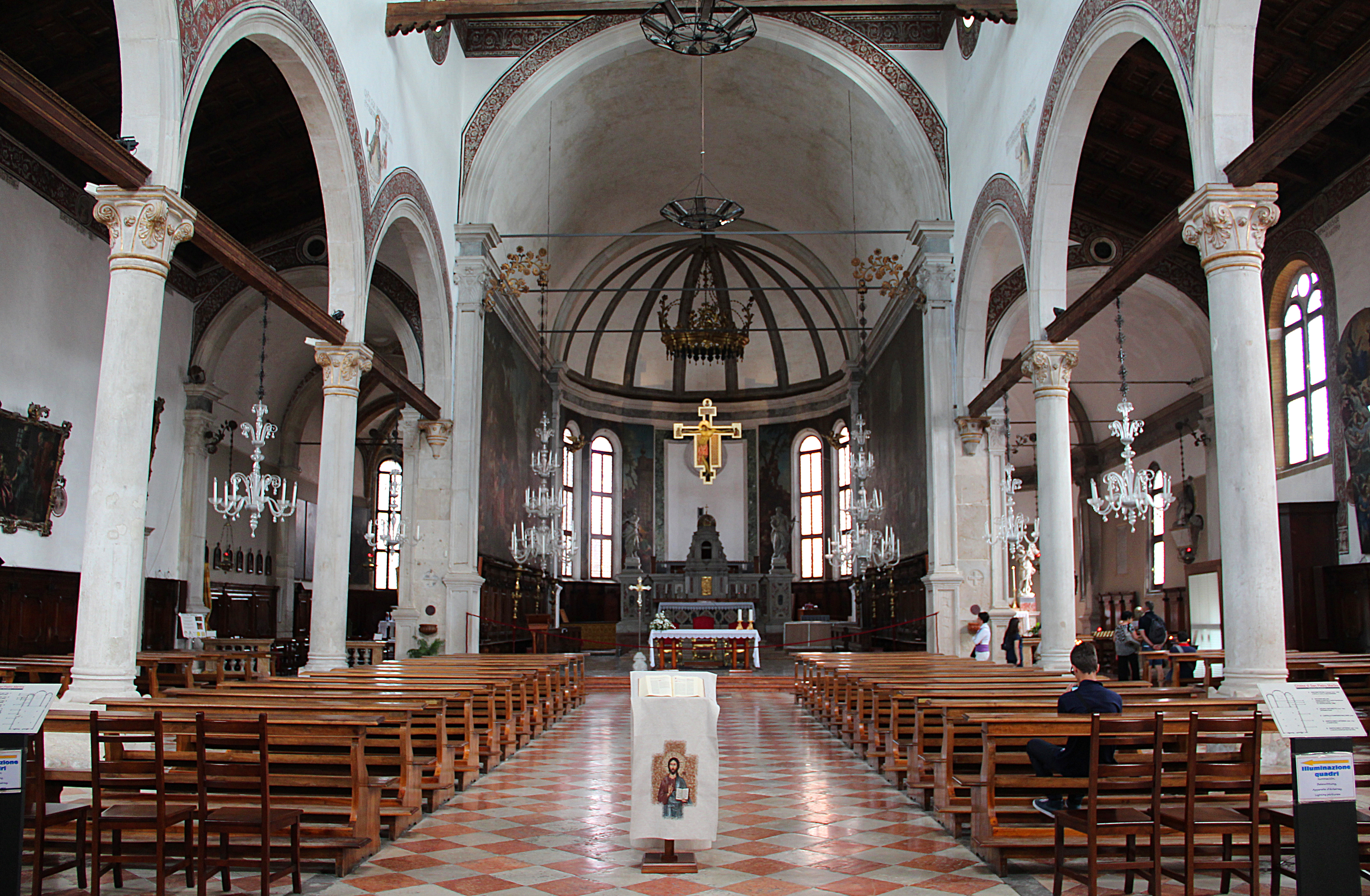
Choir, nave and aisles of the church.

== History ==
The church was edificated in 1348 along with a Dominican convent, and was originally dedicated to St. John the Baptist. In 1474 a fire razed it to the ground and in 1511 it was rebuilt to the current appearance.

It was closed on 1806, a few years after the fall of the Republic of Venice, and reopened in 1813. It is currently one of the two main parish churches in the island of Murano.

== Description ==
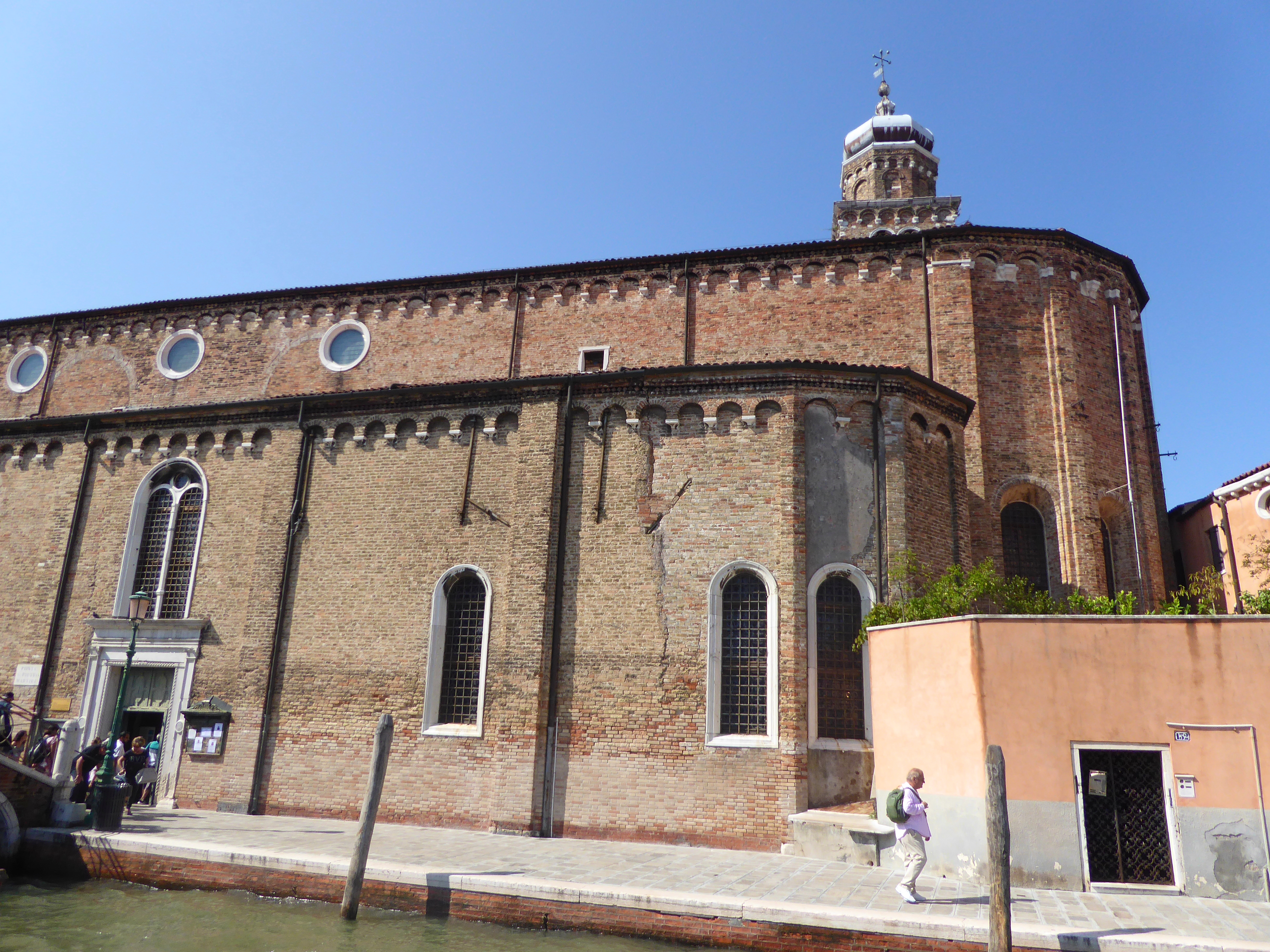
Wall of the church

The façade is in naked brickwork, divided in three sections and with a 16th-century portal, which is surmounted by a large rose window. On the left façade is a portico with Renaissance arcades and columns, perhaps what remains of the original cloister. On the same side is the bell tower, dating to 1498-1502.

The interior is on the basilica plan, with three naves divided by two series of large columns, and a wooden ceiling. The presbytery is quite large, with barrel vaults and two small side chapels. Aside from the high altar, there other minor altars, three for each nave.

Artworks in the church include a Baptism of Christ attributed to Tintoretto, in the right nave, which also houses two works by Giovanni Bellini: an Assumption with Saints (1510–1513) and the Barbarigo Altarpiece (1488), taken from the church of Santa Maria degli Angeli. Palma il Giovane's San Nicòlo, Santa Lucia, San Carlo Borromeo also features on the right wall. In the right wing is the Ballarin Chapel, built in 1506 after the death of the eponymous glassmaker from Murano. Other paintings include a St. Jerome in the Desert by Paolo Veronese (also from Santa Maria degli Angeli), the Barcaioli Altarpiece by Giovanni Agostino da Lodi (c. 1500), a Deposition from the Cross by Giuseppe Porta, a 1495 Ecce Homo (perhaps from the destroyed church of Santo Stefano in Murano).

== Sources ==
- G. Benorchia, ed. (1980). La chiesa di San Pietro Martire. Venice: Stamperia Fabrizio Olivetti.
