= Santa Maria degli Angeli, Murano =

Church in Murano, Italy

Santa Maria degli Angeli
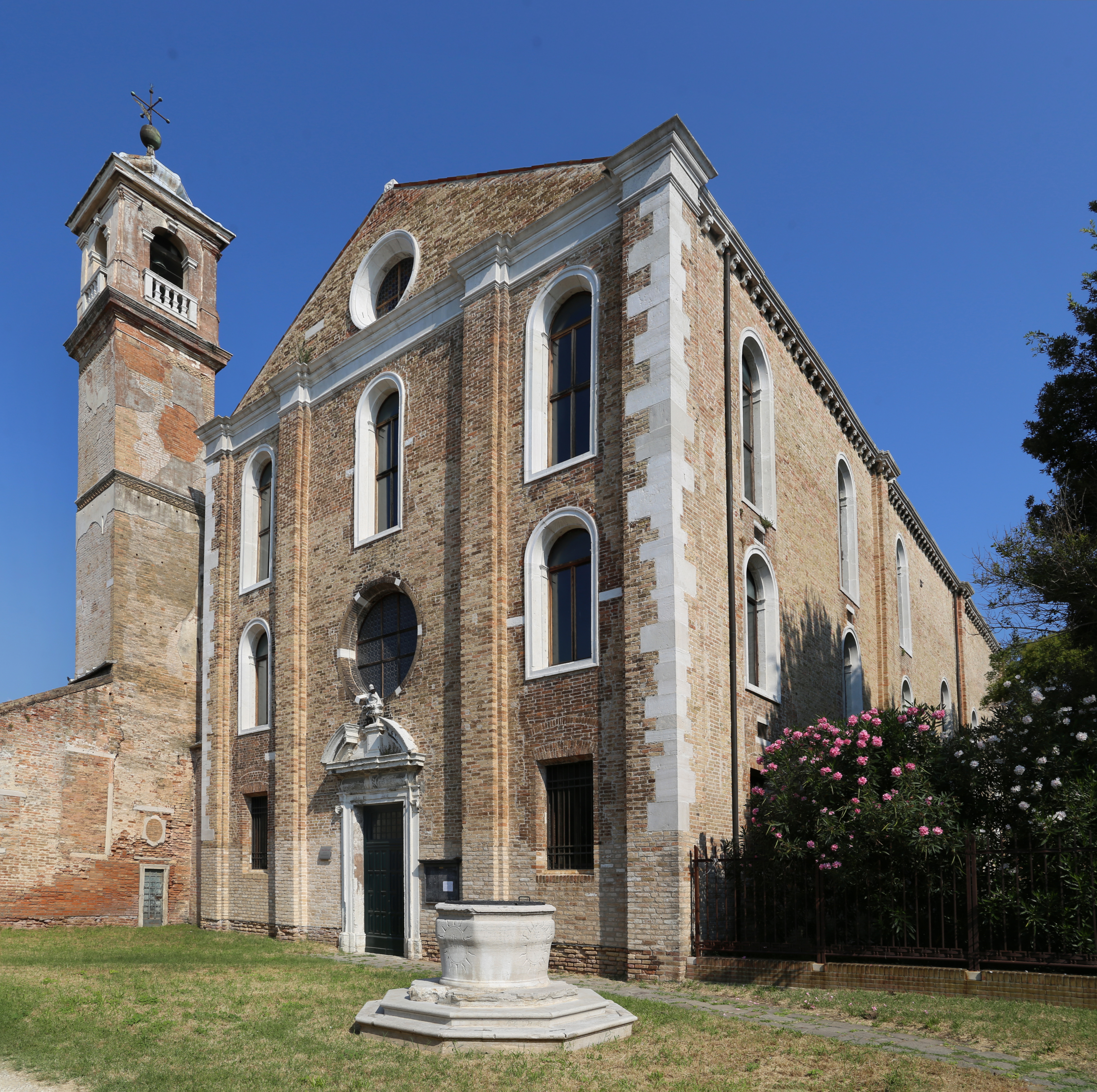
- Santa Maria degli Angeli

- Location within Italy

Religion
- Affiliation: Roman Catholic
- Province: Venice

Location
- Location: Venice, Italy
- Interactive map of Santa Maria degli Angeli
- Coordinates: 45°27′31″N 12°20′56″E

Architecture
- Completed: 1188

Santa Maria degli Angeli is a church in Murano, an island in the Venetian Lagoon, northern Italy.

== History ==
The church's origins date to 1188 when Ginevra Gradenigo, a noblewoman forced to become a nun by her father, donated to abbess Giacomina Boncio a land to build there a monastery. Demolished, rebuilt and reconsecrated in 1529, the church was then united to the monastery of Santa Maria di Piave in Lovadina, in the province of Treviso, which enriched the building. Henry III of France visited it in 1574.

The monastery housed nuns from the most prestigious noble families of Venice. The convent was suppressed in 1810 and the church was closed in 1848, and deprived of most of its treasures. Restored in 1861, it was reopened two years later.

Currently Santa Maria degli Angeli is not one of the parish churches of Murano.

== Description ==
The church is accessed from an entrance with a bas-relief in Istrian marble, depicting the "Annunciation".

The interior is home to artworks by Francesco Zugno, Antonio Molinari, Palma il Giovane (The Virgin in Glory and Saints) and Il Pordenone, who painted the Annunciation (c. 1537) at the high altar; there also the funerary monuments of the doge Sebastiano Venier, of Lorenzo Contarini and Jacopo Soranzo.

== Sources ==
- Brusegan, M. Le chiese di Venezia. Newton Compton.
