= Doric order =

Order of classical architecture

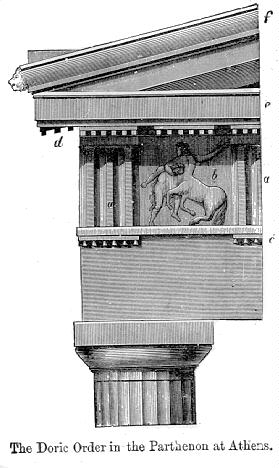
The Doric order of the Parthenon. Triglyphs marked "a", metopes "b", guttae "c" and mutules under the soffit "d"

The Doric order (Latin: Ordo Doricus) is one of the three orders of ancient Greek and later Roman architecture; the other two canonical orders were the Ionic and the Corinthian. The Doric is most easily recognized by the simple circular capitals at the bottom of the columns. Originating in the western Doric region of Greece, it is the earliest and, in its essence, the simplest of the orders, though still with complex details in the entablature above. The Doric order was the direct successor of an architecture in wood, but emerged in stone as "a still clumsy," awkward, and heavy-handed architecture.

The Greek Doric column was fluted, and had no base, dropping straight into the stylobate or platform on which the temple or other building stood. The capital was a simple circular form, with some mouldings, under a square cushion that was very wide in early versions, but later more restrained. Above a plain architrave, the complexity comes in the frieze, where the two features originally unique to the Doric, the triglyph and gutta, are skeuomorphic memories of the beams and retaining pegs of the wooden constructions that preceded stone Doric temples. In stone they are purely ornamental.

The relatively uncommon Roman and Renaissance Doric retained these, and often introduced thin layers of moulding or further ornament, as well as often using plain columns. More often, they used versions of the Tuscan order, elaborated for nationalistic reasons by Italian Renaissance writers, which is in effect a simplified Doric, with unfluted columns and a simpler entablature with no triglyphs or guttae. The Doric order was much used in Greek Revival architecture from the 18th century onwards; often earlier Greek versions were used, with wider columns and no bases to them.

The ancient architect and architectural historian Vitruvius associates the Doric with masculine proportions (the Ionic representing the feminine). It is also normally the cheapest of the orders to use. When the three orders are superposed, it is usual for the Doric to be at the bottom, with the Ionic and then the Corinthian above, and the Doric, as "strongest", is often used on the ground floor below another order in the floor above.

== History ==
=== Greek ===
In their original Greek version, Doric columns stood directly on the flat pavement (the stylobate) of a temple without a base. With a height only four to eight times their diameter, the columns were the most squat of all the classical orders; their vertical shafts were fluted with 20 parallel concave grooves, each rising to a sharp edge called an arris. They were topped by a smooth capital that flared from the column to meet a square abacus at the intersection with the horizontal beam (architrave) that they carried.

The Parthenon is in the Doric order, and in antiquity and subsequently has been recognized as the most perfect example of the evolved order. It was most popular in the Archaic Period (750–480 BC) in mainland Greece, and also found in Magna Graecia (southern Italy), as in the three temples at Paestum. These are in Archaic Doric, where the capitals spread wide from the column compared to later Classical forms, as exemplified in the Parthenon.

Pronounced features of both Greek and Roman versions of the Doric order are the alternating triglyphs and metopes. The triglyphs are decoratively grooved with two vertical grooves ("tri-glyph") and represent the original wooden end-beams, which rest on the plain architrave that occupies the lower half of the entablature. Under each triglyph are peglike "stagons" or "guttae" (literally: drops) that appear as if they were hammered in from below to stabilize the post-and-beam (trabeated) construction. They also served to "organize" rainwater runoff from above. The spaces between the triglyphs are the "metopes". They may be left plain, or they may be carved in low relief.

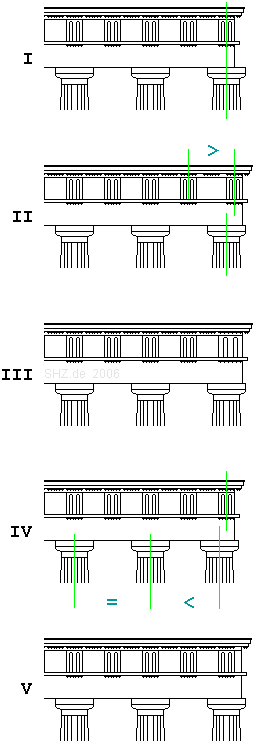
The Doric corner conflict

==== Spacing the triglyphs ====
The spacing of the triglyphs caused problems, which took some time to resolve. A triglyph is centered above every column, with another (or sometimes two) between columns, though the Greeks felt that the corner triglyph should form the corner of the entablature, creating an inharmonious mismatch with the supporting column.

The architecture followed the rules of harmony. Since the original design probably came from wooden temples and the triglyphs were real heads of wooden beams, every column had to bear a beam that lay across the centre of the column. Triglyphs were arranged regularly; the last triglyph was centred upon the last column (illustration, right: I.). This was regarded as the ideal solution that had to be reached.

Changing to stone cubes instead of wooden beams required full support of the architrave load at the last column. At the first temples the final triglyph was moved (illustration, right: II.), still terminating the sequence, but leaving a gap disturbing the regular order. Even worse, the last triglyph was not centered with the corresponding column. That "archaic" manner was not regarded as a harmonious design. The resulting problem is called the Doric corner conflict. Another approach was to apply a broader corner triglyph (III.), but was not really satisfying.

Because the metopes are somewhat flexible in their proportions, the modular space between columns ("intercolumniation") can be adjusted by the architect. Often, the last two columns were set slightly closer together (corner contraction), to give a subtle visual strengthening to the corners. That is called the "classic" solution of the corner conflict (IV.). Triglyphs could be arranged in a harmonic manner again, and the corner was terminated with a triglyph, though the final triglyph and column were often not centered. Roman aesthetics did not demand that a triglyph form the corner, and filled it with a half (demi-) metope, allowing triglyphs centered over columns (illustration, right, V.).

==== Temples ====
There are many theories as to the origins of the Doric order in temples. The term Doric is believed to have originated from the Greek-speaking Dorian tribes. One belief is that the Doric order is the result of early wood prototypes of previous temples. With no hard proof and the sudden appearance of stone temples from one period after the other, this becomes mostly speculation. Another belief is that the Doric was inspired by the architecture of Egypt. With the Greeks being present in Ancient Egypt as early as the 7th-century BC, it is possible that Greek traders were inspired by the structures they saw in what they would consider a foreign land. Finally, another theory states that the inspiration for the Doric came from Mycenae. At the ruins of this civilization lies architecture very similar to the Doric order.

Yet another theory suggests that the plan of Doric temples originated with the megaron plan found since the 3rd millennium in continental Greece, and was expanded toward the cult statue typically located at the rear of the central hall.

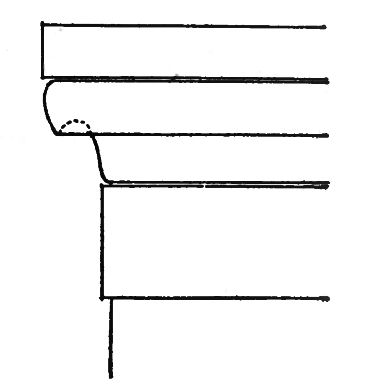
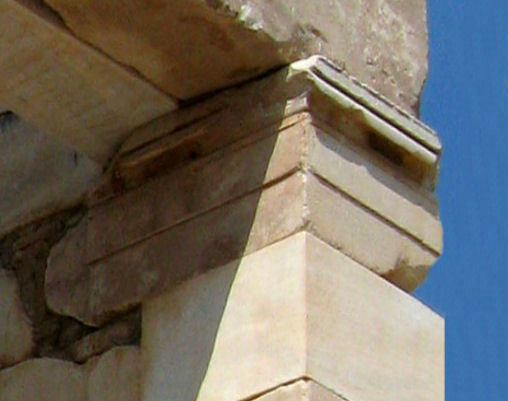
Left image: Characteristic shape of the Doric anta capital.
Right image: Doric anta capital at the Athenian Treasury (c. 500 BC).

The layout gained popularity through the 6th century. Some of the earliest examples of the Doric order come from the 7th-century BC. These examples include the Temple of Apollo at Corinth and the Temple of Zeus at Nemea. Other examples of the Doric order include the three 6th-century BC temples at Paestum in southern Italy, a region called Magna Graecia, which was settled by Greek colonists. Compared to later versions, the columns are much more massive, with a strong entasis or swelling, and wider capitals.

The Temple of the Delians is a "peripteral" Doric order temple, the largest of three dedicated to Apollo on the island of Delos. It was begun in 478 BC and never finished. During their period of independence from Athens, the Delians reassigned the temple to the island of Poros. It is "hexastyle", with six columns across the pedimented end and thirteen along each long face. All the columns are centered under a triglyph in the frieze, except for the corner columns. The plain, unfluted shafts on the columns stand directly on the platform (the stylobate), without bases. The recessed "necking" in the nature of fluting at the top of the shafts and the wide cushionlike echinus may be interpreted as slightly self-conscious archaising features, for Delos is Apollo's ancient birthplace. However, the similar fluting at the base of the shafts might indicate an intention for the plain shafts to be capable of wrapping in drapery.

A classic statement of the Greek Doric order is the Temple of Hephaestus in Athens, built about 447 BC. The contemporary Parthenon, the largest temple in classical Athens, represents the peak of perfection of Doric order architecture, although the sculptural enrichment is more familiar in the Ionic order: the Greeks were never as doctrinaire in the use of the Classical vocabulary as Renaissance theorists or Neoclassical architects. The detail, part of the basic vocabulary of trained architects from the later 18th century onwards, shows how the width of the metopes was flexible: here they bear the famous sculptures including the battle of Lapiths and Centaurs.

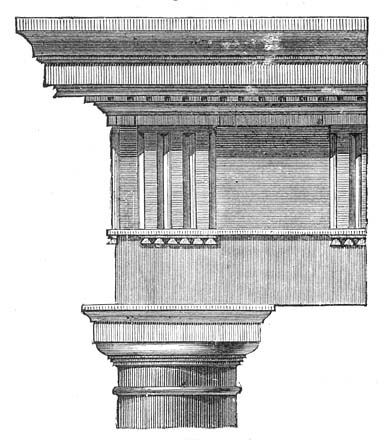
The Roman Doric order from the Theater of Marcellus: triglyphs centered over the end column

=== Roman ===
In the Roman Doric version, the height of the entablature has been reduced. The endmost triglyph is centered over the column rather than occupying the corner of the architrave. The columns are slightly less robust in their proportions. Below their caps, an astragal molding encircles the column like a ring. Crown molding softens transitions between frieze and cornice and emphasizes the upper edge of the abacus, which is the upper part of the capital.

Roman Doric columns also have moldings at their bases and stand on low square pads or are even raised on plinths. In the Roman Doric mode, columns are not usually fluted; indeed, fluting is rare. Since the Romans did not insist on a triglyph-covered corner, now both columns and triglyphs could be arranged equidistantly again and centered together. The architrave corner needed to be left "blank", which is sometimes referred to as a half, or demi-, metope (illustration, V., in Spacing the Columns above).

The Roman architect Vitruvius, following contemporary practice, outlined in his treatise the procedure for laying out constructions based on a module, which he took to be one half a column's diameter, taken at the base. An illustration of Andrea Palladio's Doric order, as it was laid out, with modules identified, by Isaac Ware, in The Four Books of Palladio's Architecture (London, 1738), is illustrated at Vitruvian module.

According to Vitruvius, the height of Doric columns is six or seven times the diameter at the base. This gives the Doric columns a shorter, thicker look than Ionic columns, which have 8:1 proportions. It is suggested that these proportions give the Doric columns a masculine appearance, whereas the more slender Ionic columns appear to represent a more feminine look. This sense of masculinity and femininity was often used to determine which type of column would be used for a particular structure.

Later periods reviving classical architecture used the Roman Doric until Neoclassical architecture arrived in the later 18th century. This followed the first good illustrations and measured descriptions of Greek Doric buildings. The most influential, and perhaps the earliest, use of the Doric in Renaissance architecture was in the circular Tempietto by Donato Bramante (1502 or later), in the courtyard of San Pietro in Montorio, Rome.

==== Decline ====
Towards the latter part of the 5th century, a new preference for a more flexible architectural style led to a decline of the Doric order. Although no longer the preferred architectural style, it remained as a basic element of the Roman and Hellenistic periods.

==== Graphics of ancient forms ====
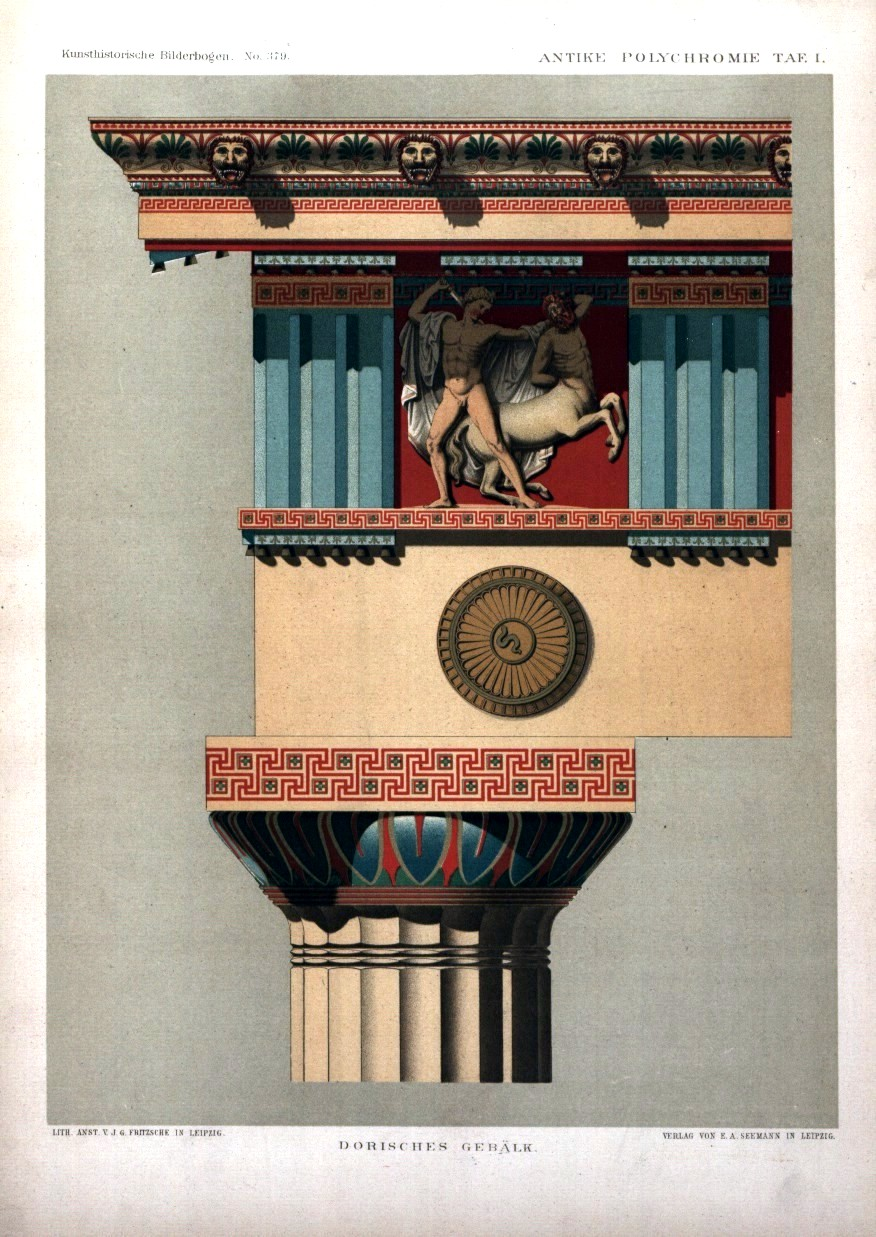
Original Doric polychromy

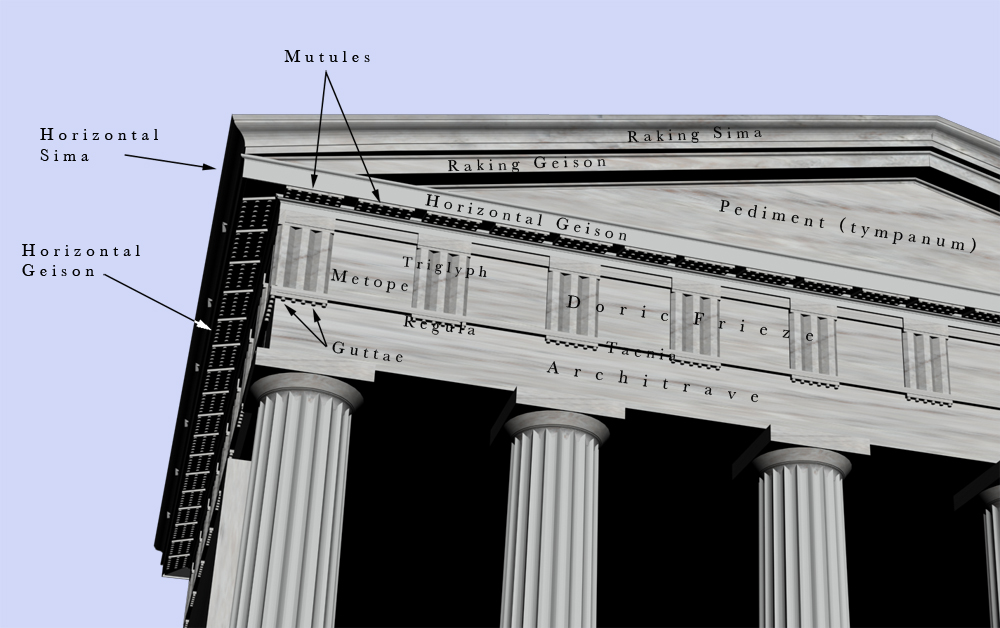
Upper parts, labelled

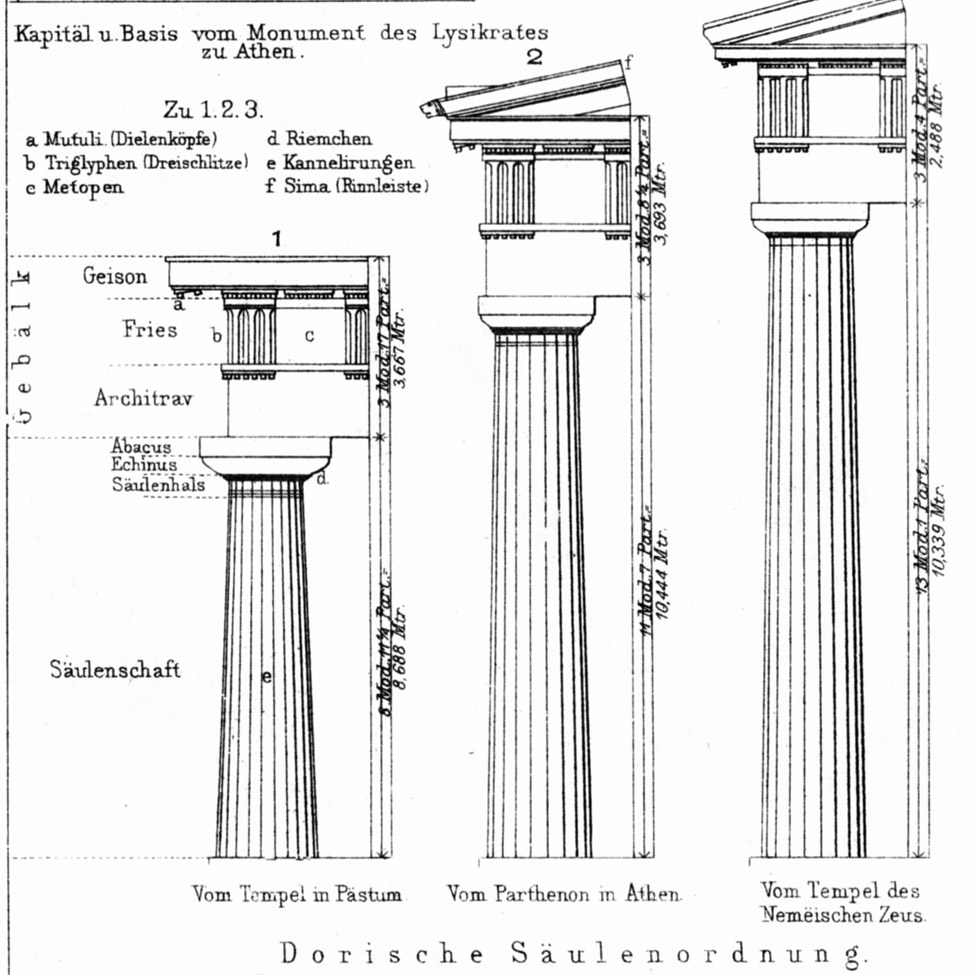
Three Greek Doric columns

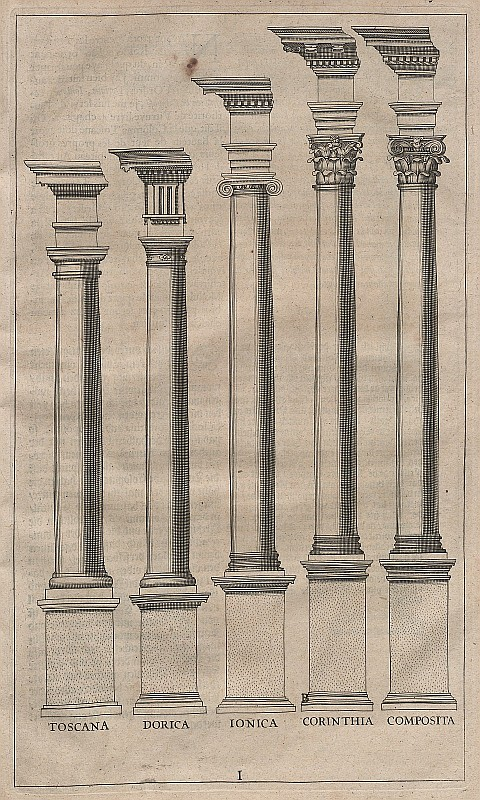
The Five Orders, originally illustrated by Giacomo Barozzi da Vignola, 1640

Comparison of the Doric, Tuscan, Ionic, Corinthian, and Composite orders

=== Modern ===
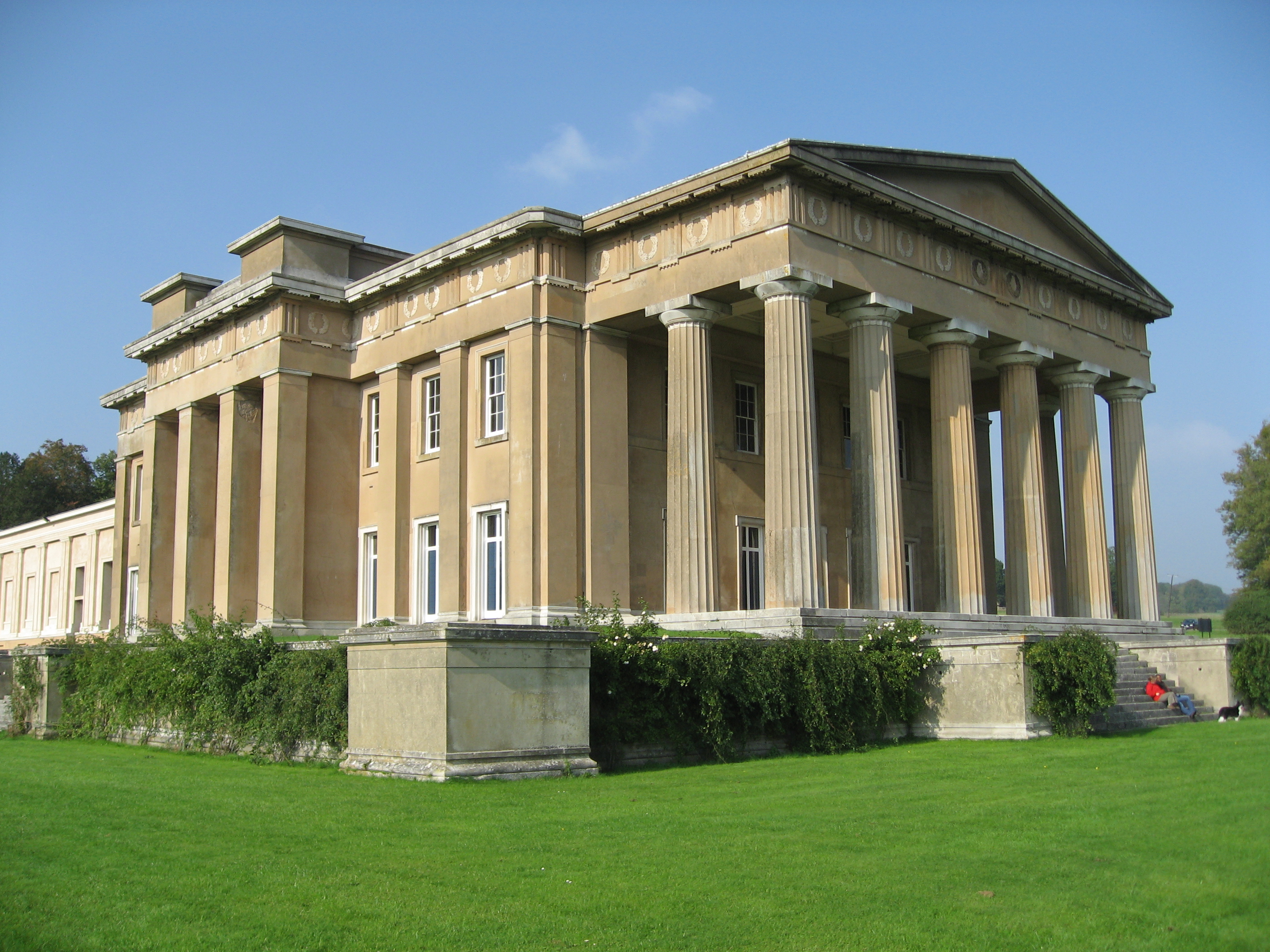
The Grange, nearby Northington, England, by William Wilkins, 1804, Europe's first house designed with all external detail of a Greek temple

Before Greek Revival architecture grew, initially in England, in the 18th century, the Greek or elaborated Roman Doric order had not been very widely used, though "Tuscan" types of round capitals were always popular, especially in less formal buildings. It was sometimes used in military contexts, for example, the Royal Hospital Chelsea (1682 onwards, by Christopher Wren). The first engraved illustrations of the Greek Doric order date to the mid-18th century. Its appearance in the new phase of Classicism brought with it new connotations of high-minded primitive simplicity, seriousness of purpose, noble sobriety.

In Germany, it suggested a contrast with the French, and in the United States, republican virtues. In a customs house, Greek Doric suggested incorruptibility; in a Protestant church, a Greek Doric porch promised a return to an untainted early church; it was equally appropriate for a library, a bank, or a trustworthy public utility. The revived Doric did not return to Sicily until 1789, when a French architect researching the ancient Greek temples designed an entrance to the Botanical Gardens in Palermo.

== Examples ==
Ancient Greek, Archaic

- Temple of Artemis, Corfu, the earliest known stone Doric temple
- Temple of Hera, Olympia
- Delphi, temple of Apollo
- The three temples at Paestum, Italy
- Valle dei Templi, Agrigento, Temple of Juno, Agrigento and others
- Temple of Aphaea

Ancient Greek, Classical

- Temple of Zeus, Olympia
- Temple of Hephaestus
- Bassae, Temple of Apollo
- Parthenon, Athens
- Sounion, Temple of Poseidon

Renaissance and Baroque

- The Tempietto by Donato Bramante, in the courtyard of San Pietro in Montorio, Rome
- Palace of Charles V, Granada, 1527, circular arcade in the courtyard, under Ionic in the upper storey
- Basilica Palladiana, in Vicenza, Andrea Palladio, 1546 on, arcade under Ionic above
- Valladolid Cathedral, Juan de Herrera, begun 1589

Neoclassical and Greek Revival

- Brandenburg Gate, Berlin, 1788
- The Grange, Northington, 1804
- Lord Hill's Column, Shrewsbury, England, 1814, 133 feet 6 inches (40.69 m) high
- Neue Wache, Berlin, 1816
- Royal High School, Edinburgh, completed 1829
- Walhalla, Regensburg, Bavaria, 1842
- Propylaea, Munich, 1854

United States

- Second Bank of the United States, Philadelphia, 1824
- Naval Medical Center Portsmouth, 1827, pedimented temple front with ten columns
- Federal Hall, New York, 1842
- Perry's Victory and International Peace Memorial in Put-in-Bay, Ohio, is the world's tallest and most massive Doric column at 352 feet (107 m).
- Harding Tomb in Marion, Ohio, is a circular Greek temple design with Doric columns.

== Gallery ==
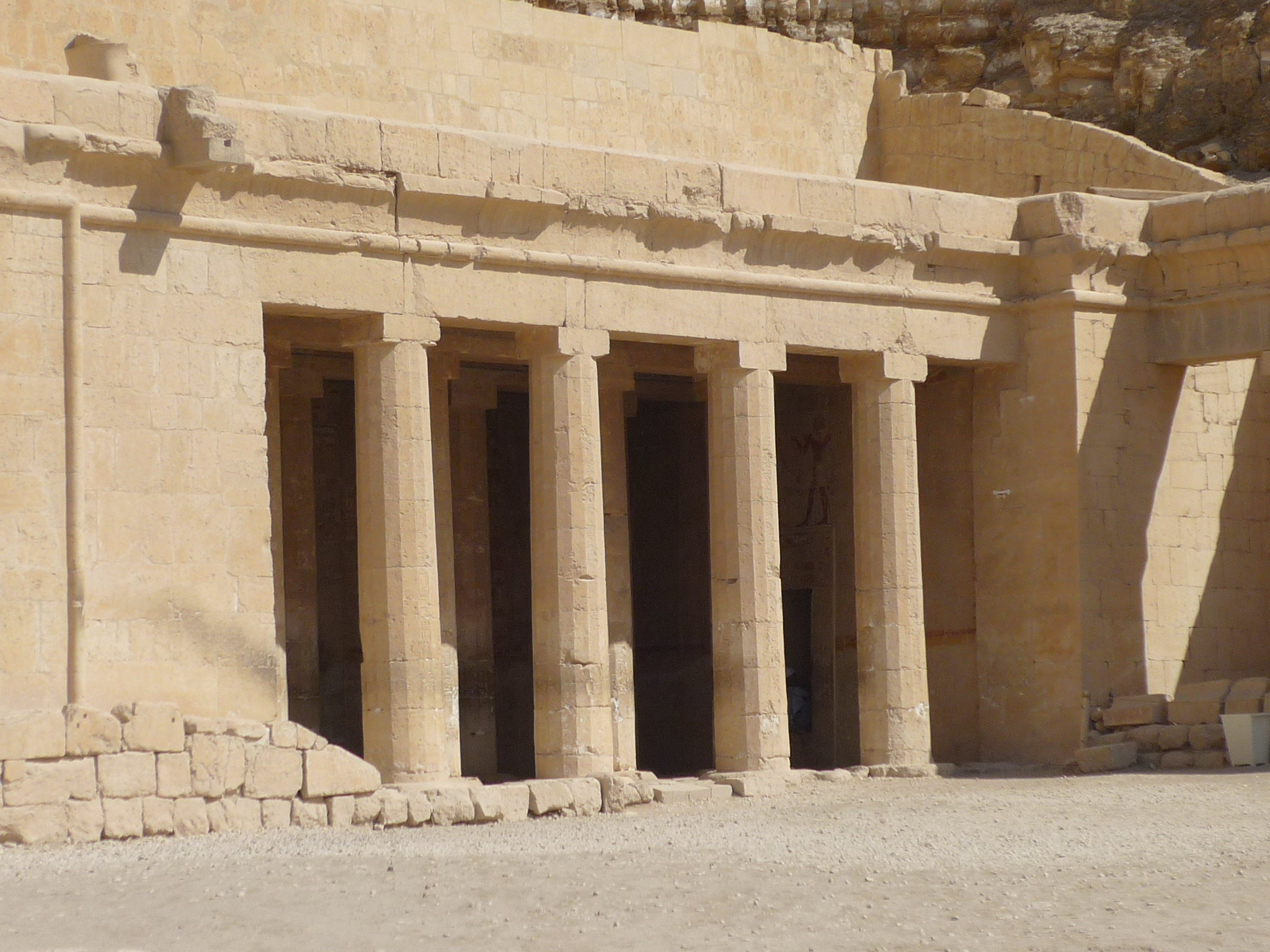
Possible inspiration for the Doric order: Ancient Egyptian columns of the shrine of Anubis at the Temple of Hatshepsut, Deir el-Bahari, Egypt, c.1470 BC

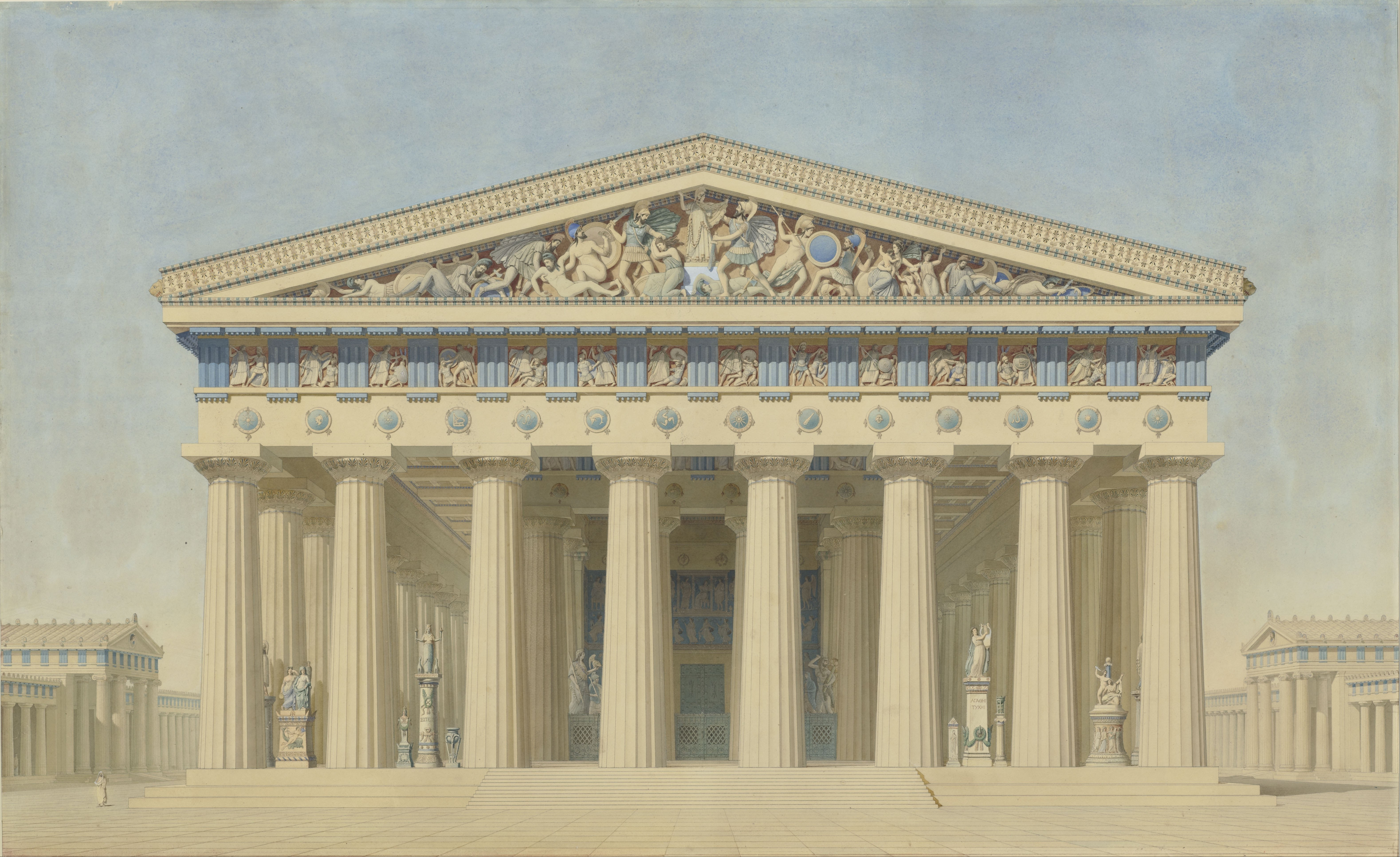
19th century illustration of the main façade of the Ancient Greek Temple T at Selinunte, Sicily, Italy, showing how all the ancient Doric buildings were polychromatic, by Jacques Ignace Hittorff, before 1859

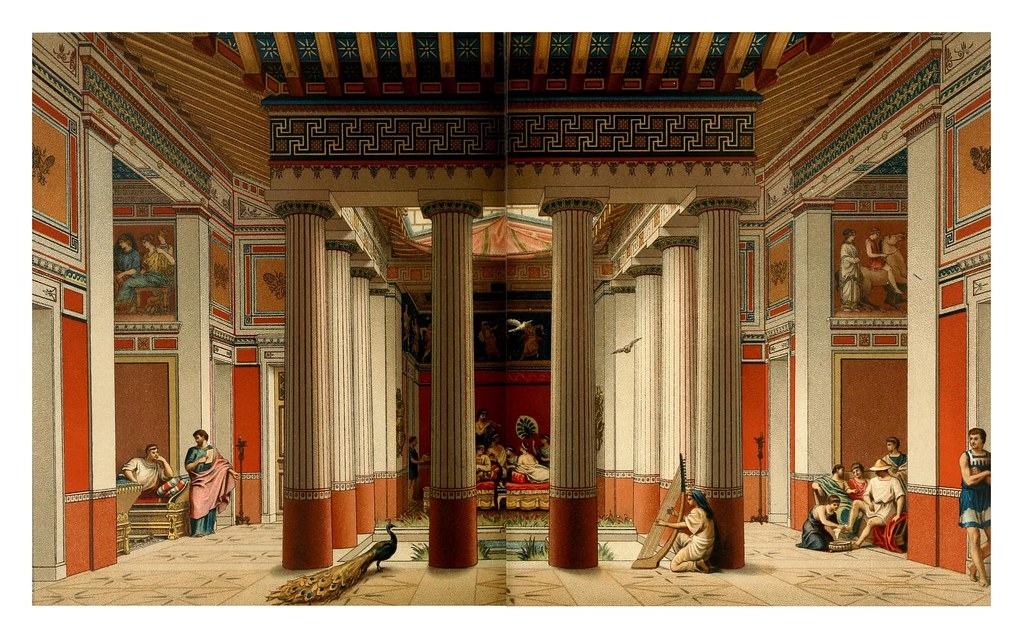
Illustration of a peristyle with Doric columns the home of a rich Athenian woman, showing the polychromy Doric columns had in antiquity, from Wonders – Images of the Ancient World, 1907

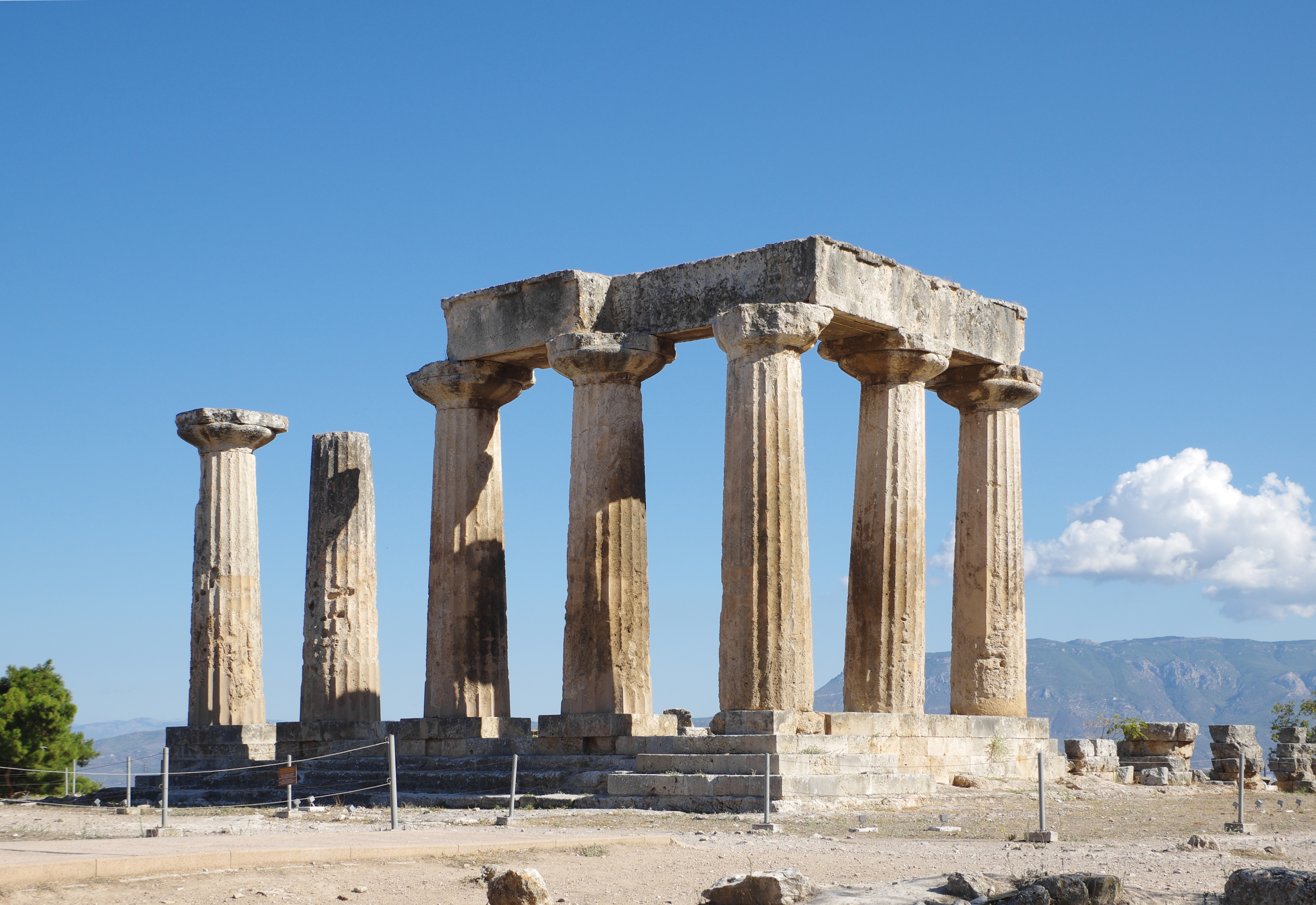
Ancient Greek columns of the Temple of Apollo, Corinth, Greece, c.540 BC

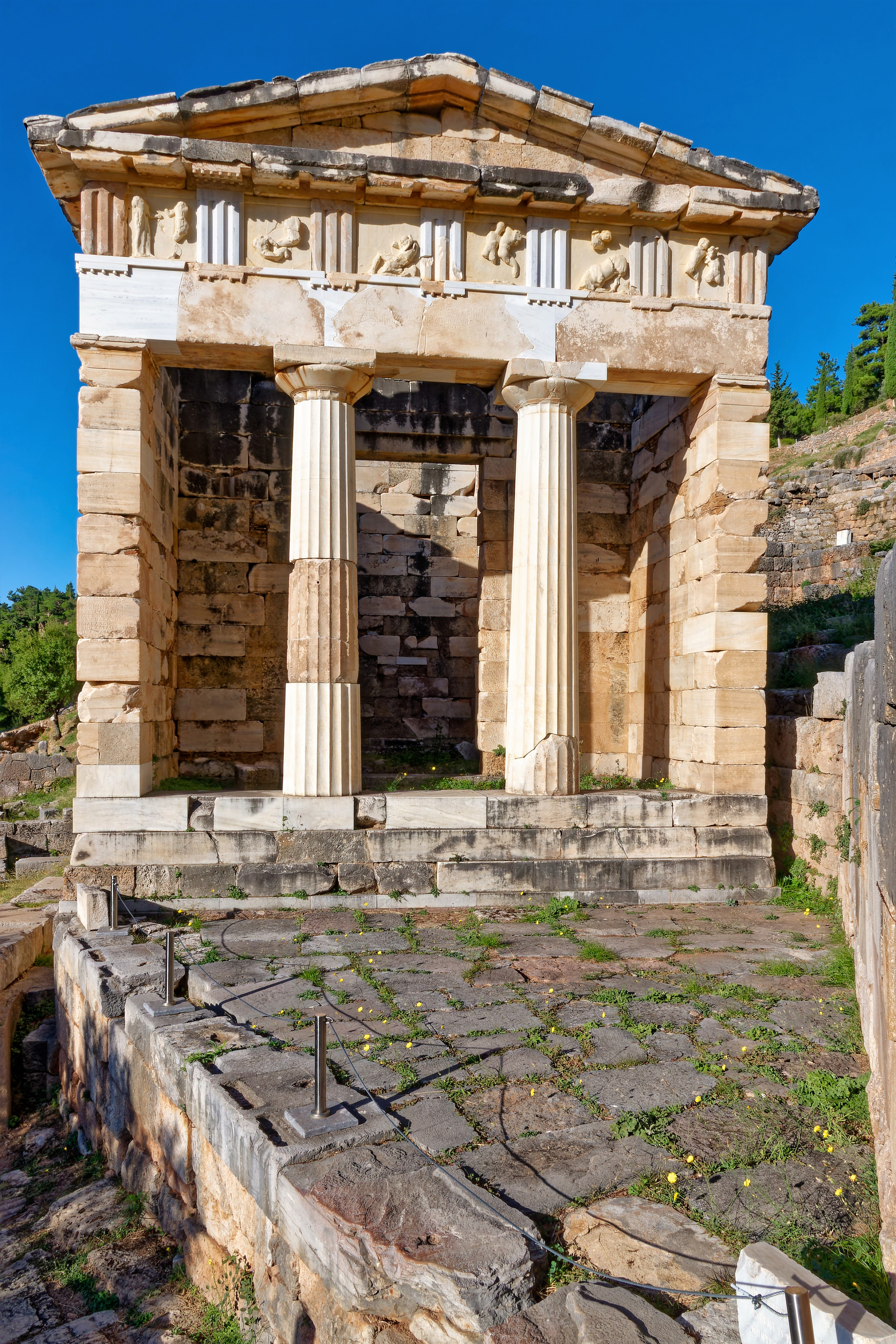
Ancient Greek Doric columns and entablature of the Athenian Treasury, Delphi, Greece, c.525 BC

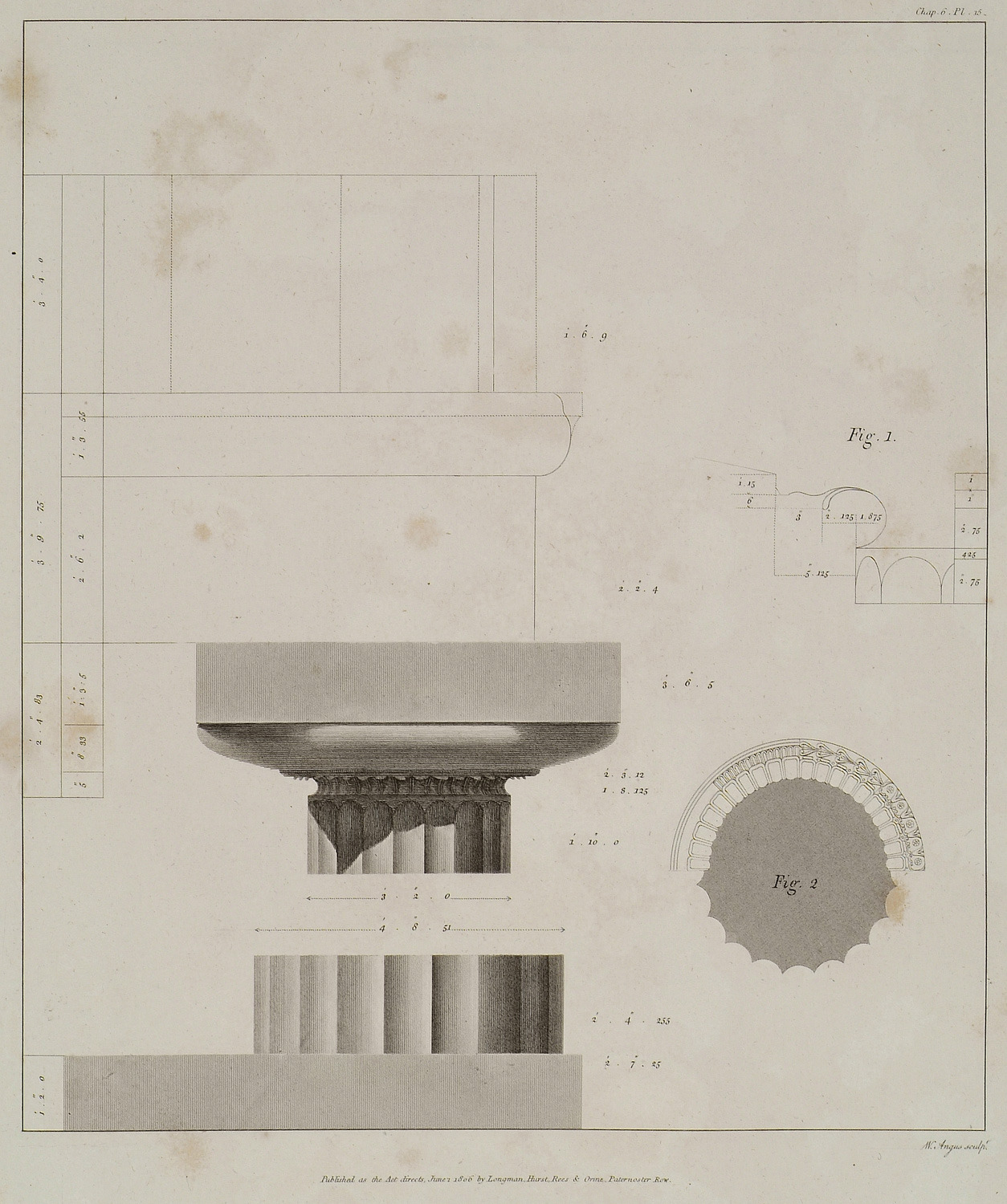
Ancient Greek Doric capital of the Temple of Hera I, Paestum, Italy, with a band of compressed leafs just under the echine, 425 BC

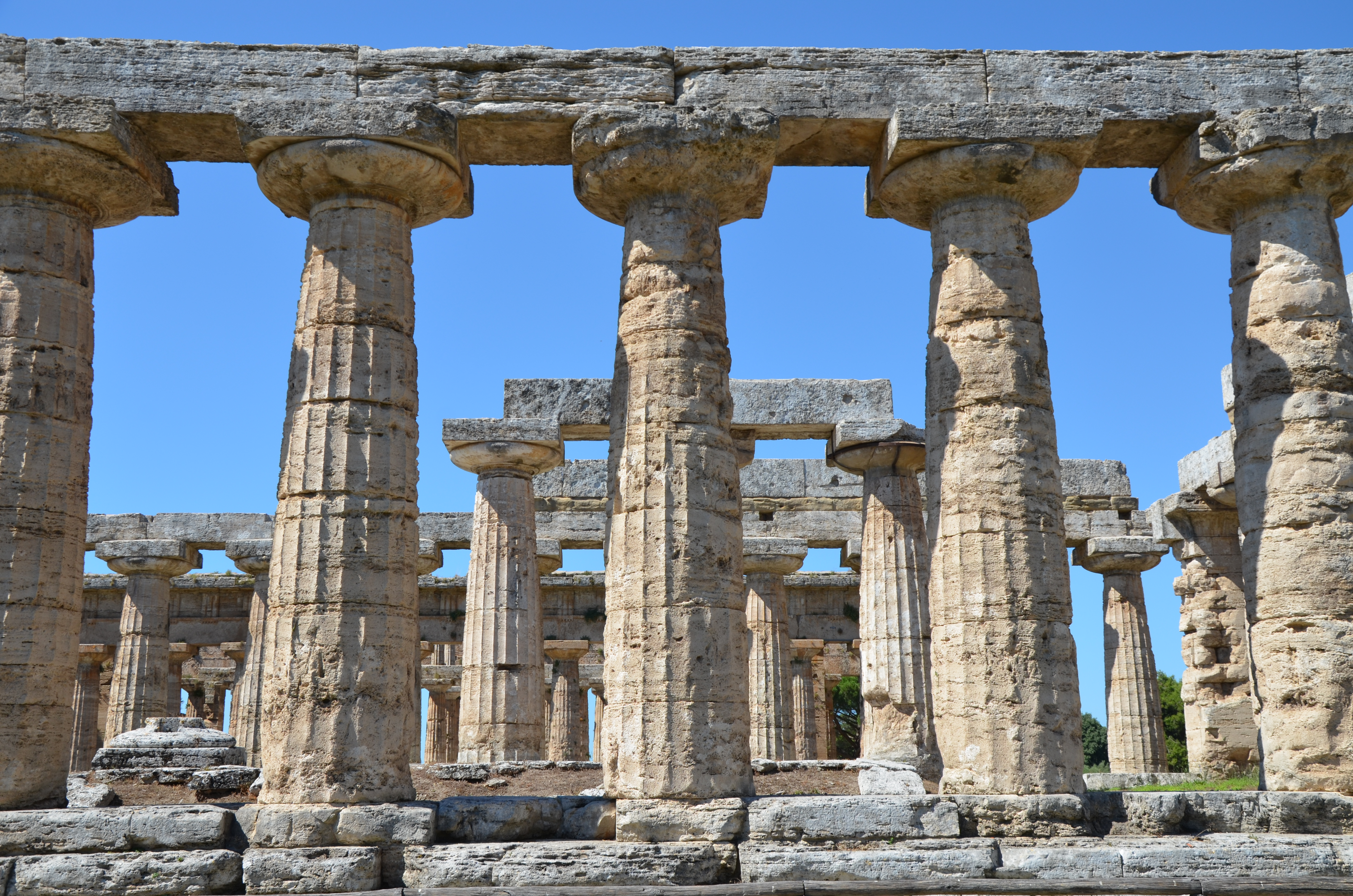
Ancient Greek Doric columns of the Temple of Hera I, with their usually large entasis on the shafts

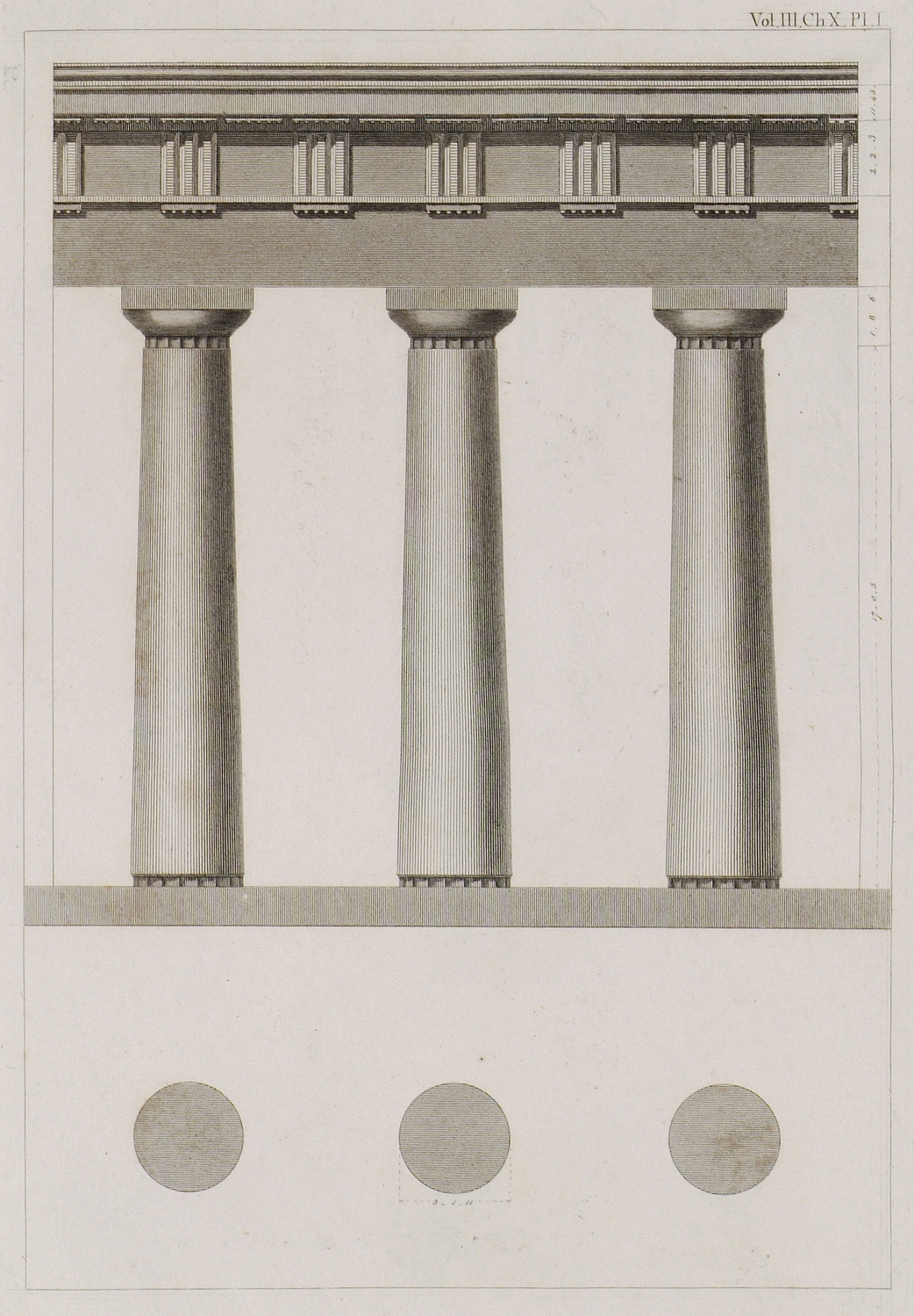
Ancient Greek Doric columns of the Temple of the Delians, Delos, Greece, fluted only at the top and bottom of the shaft, 5th century BC

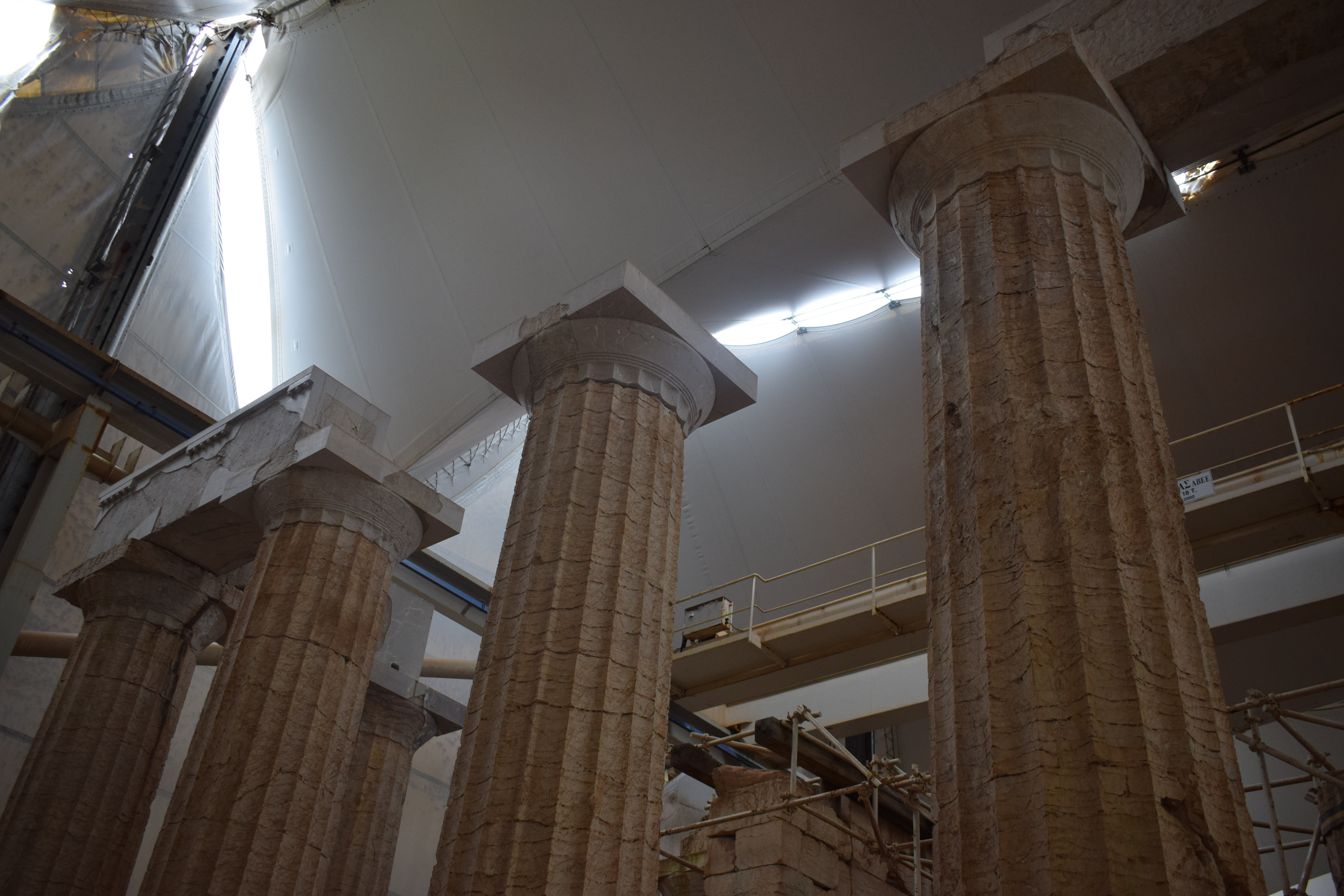
Ancient Greek Doric capitals in the Temple of Apollo at Bassae, Bassae, Greece, c.429-400 BC

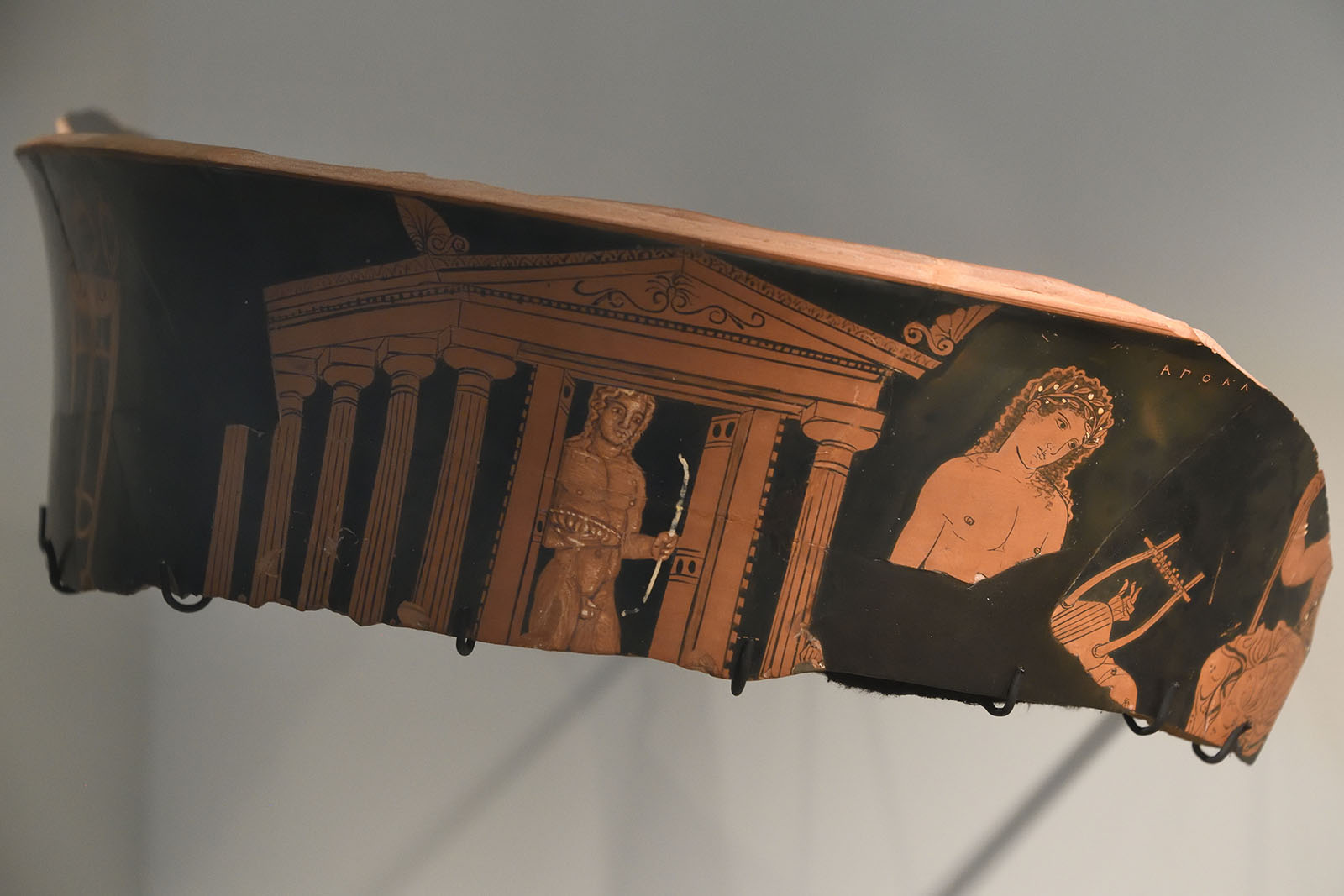
Ancient Greek Doric temple depicted stylized on an amphora shard, c.400-385 BC, ceramic, Allard Pierson Museum, Amsterdam, the Netherlands

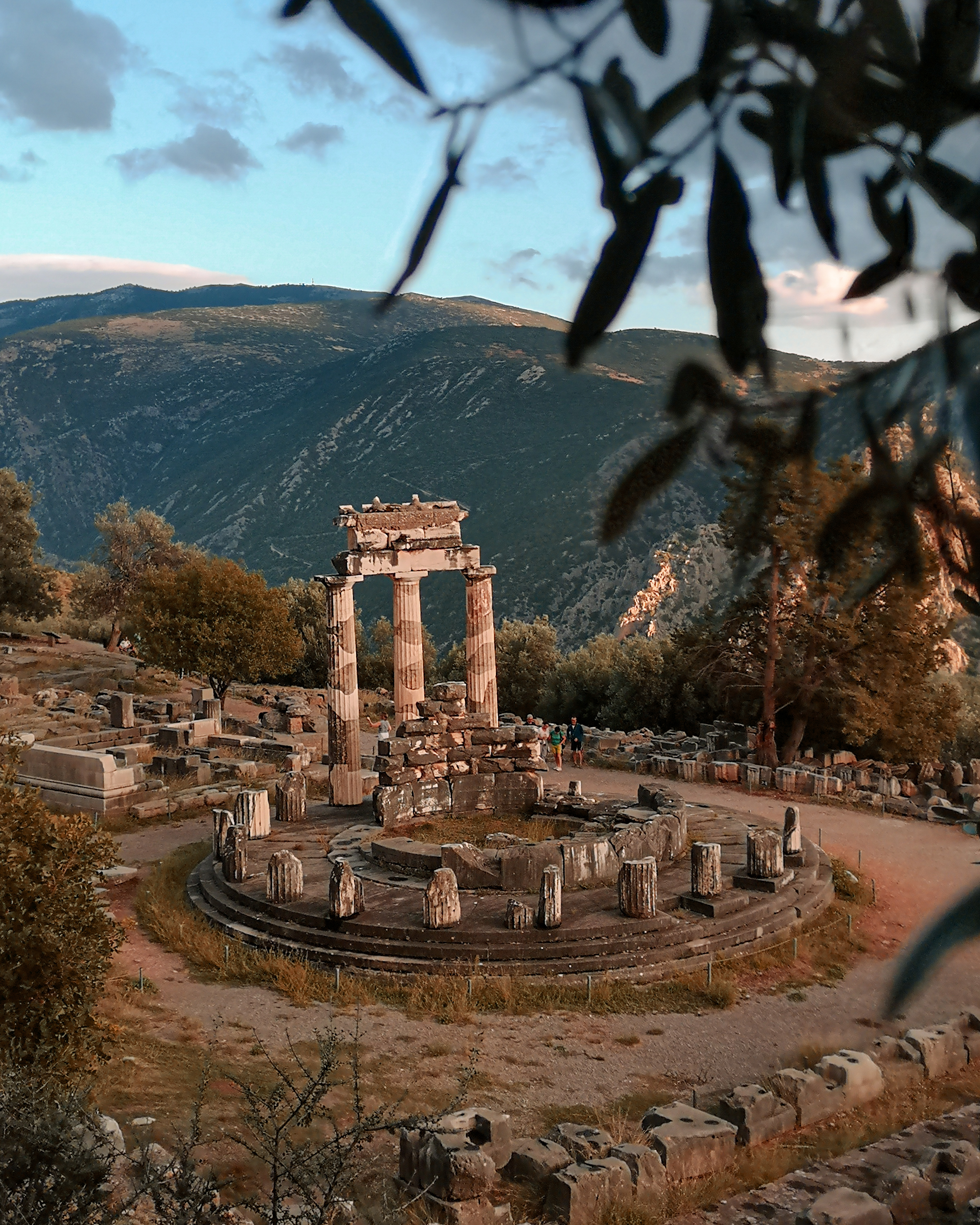
Ancient Greek Doric columns of the Tholos of Delphi, Greece, c.375 BC

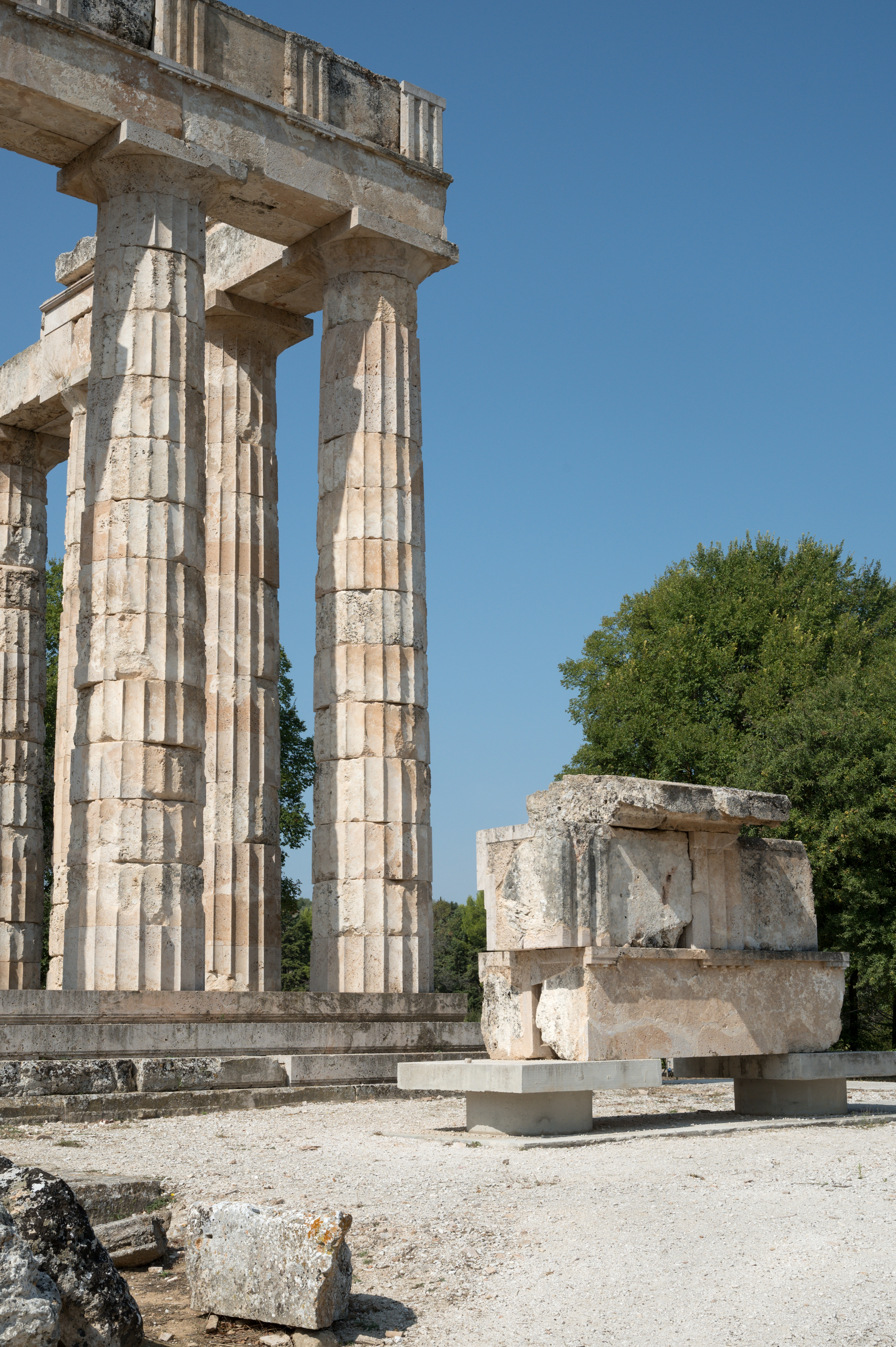
Ancient Greek Doric columns of the Temple of Zeus, Nemea, Greece, c.330 BC

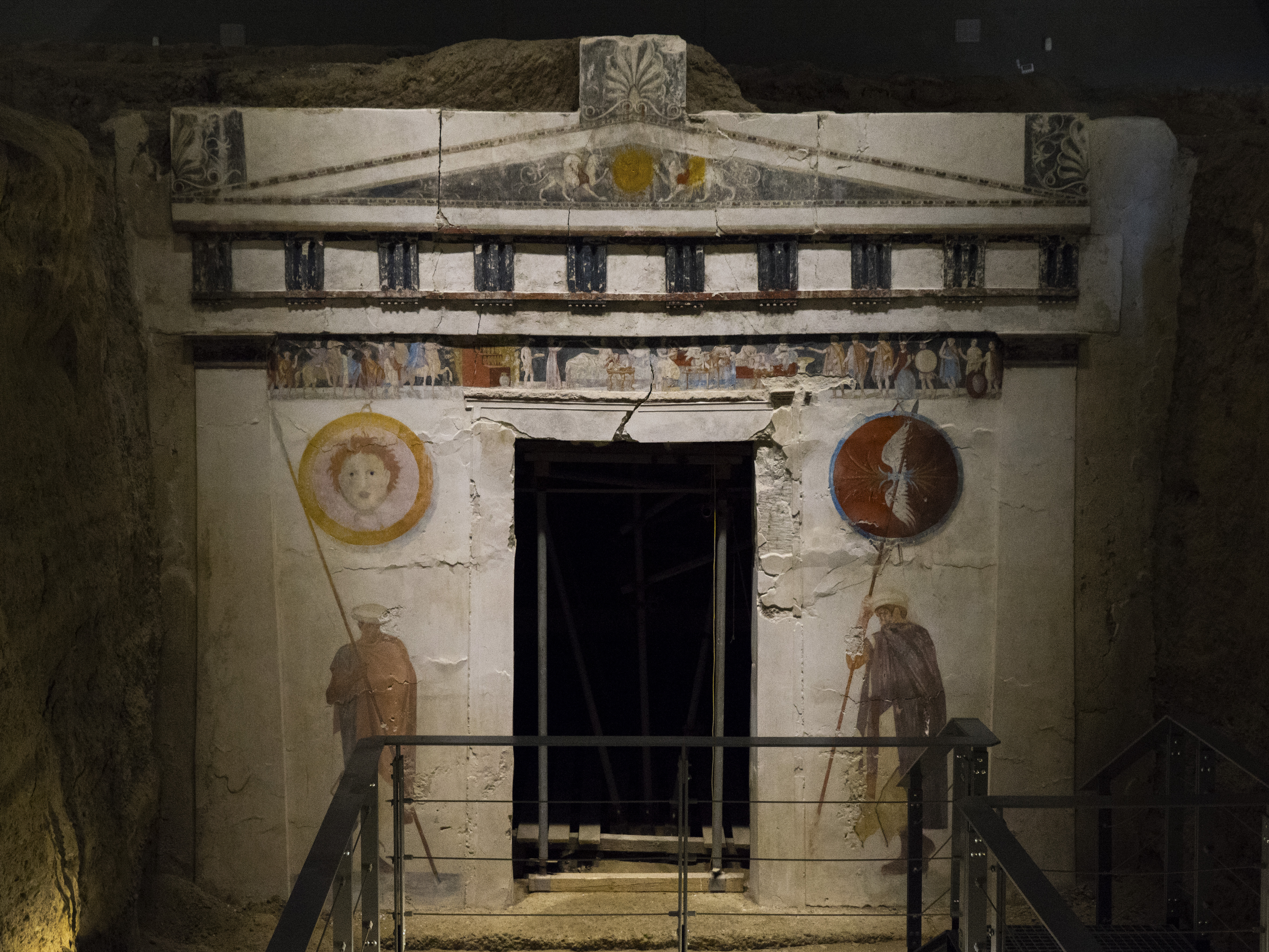
Ancient Greek Doric pilasters and entablature of the Tomb III, Agios Athanasios, Greece, 325-300 BC

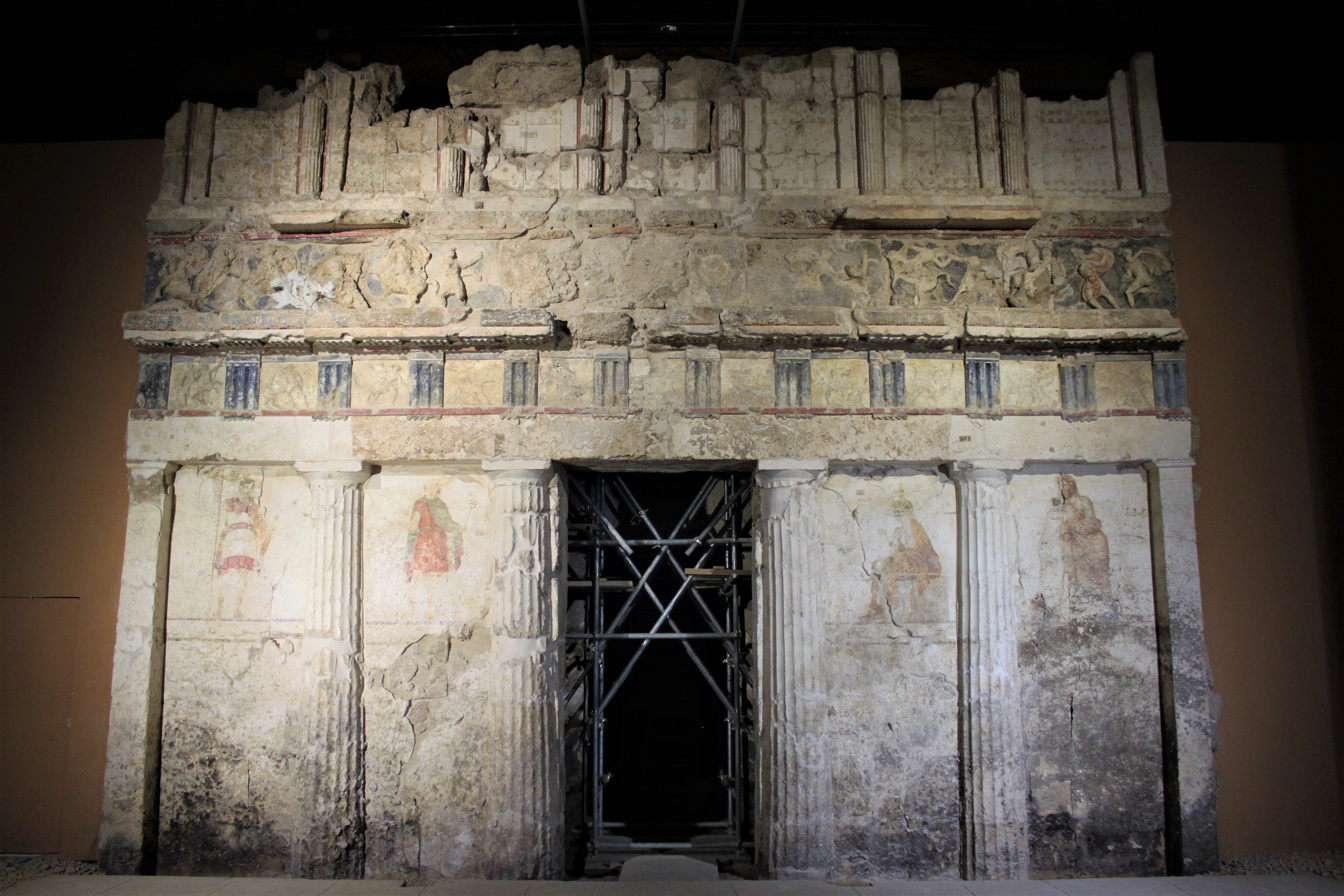
Ancient Greek Doric columns of the Great Tomb of Lefkadia, Mieza, Greece, c.300 BC

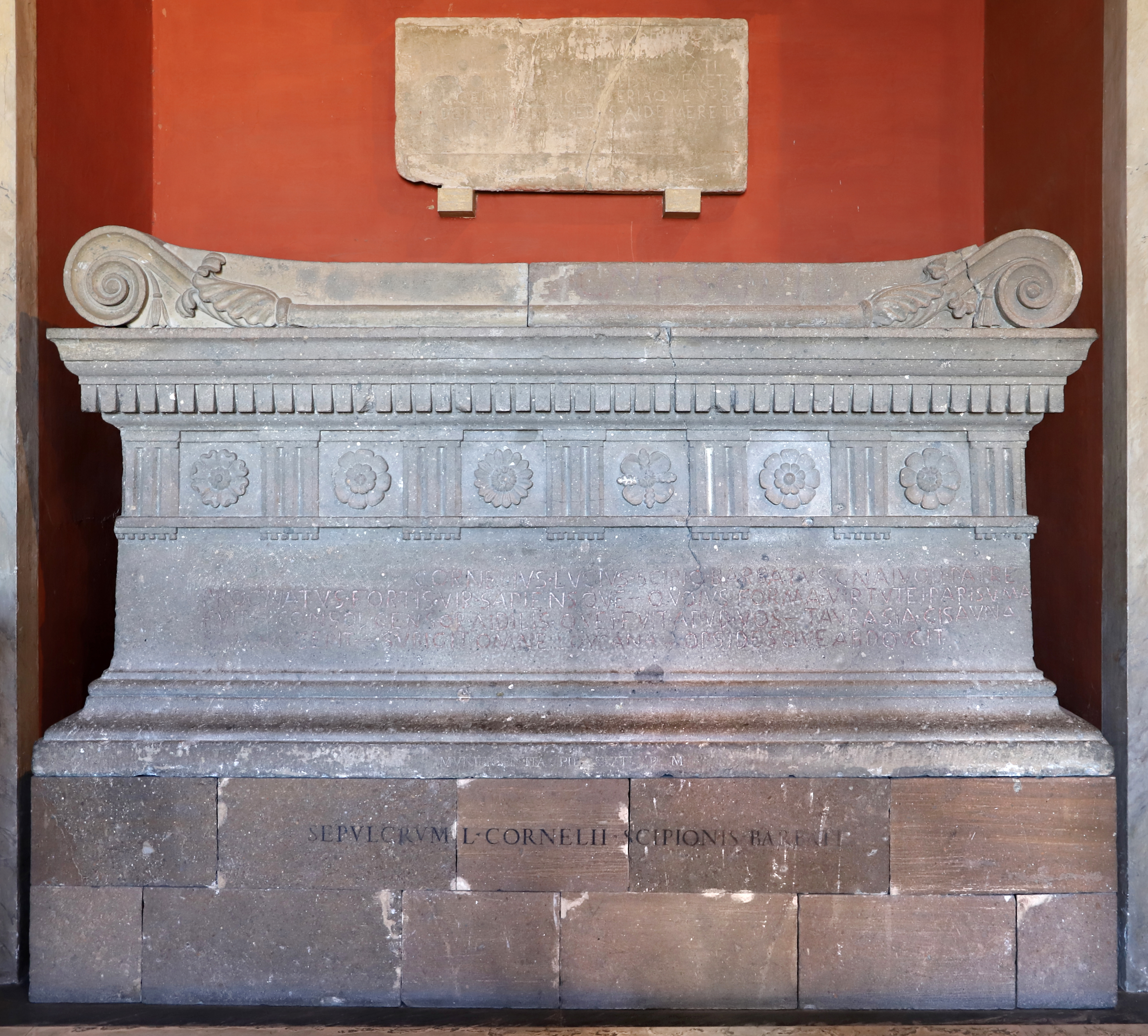
Roman Doric frieze on the Sarcophagus of Lucius Cornelius Scipio Barbatus, Vatican Museums, Rome, c.270 BC

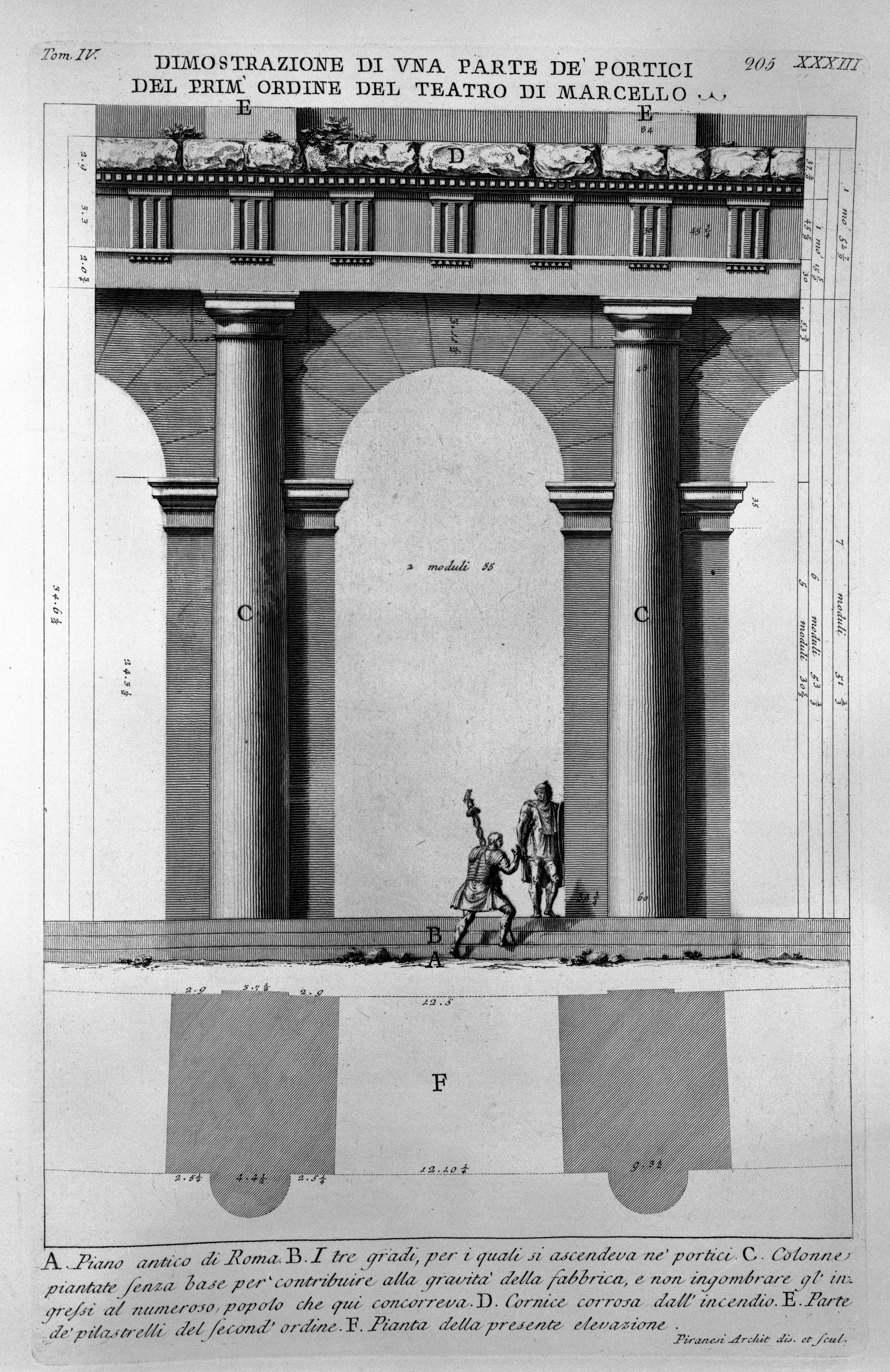
Roman Doric order of the Theatre of Marcellus, Rome, 1st century BC

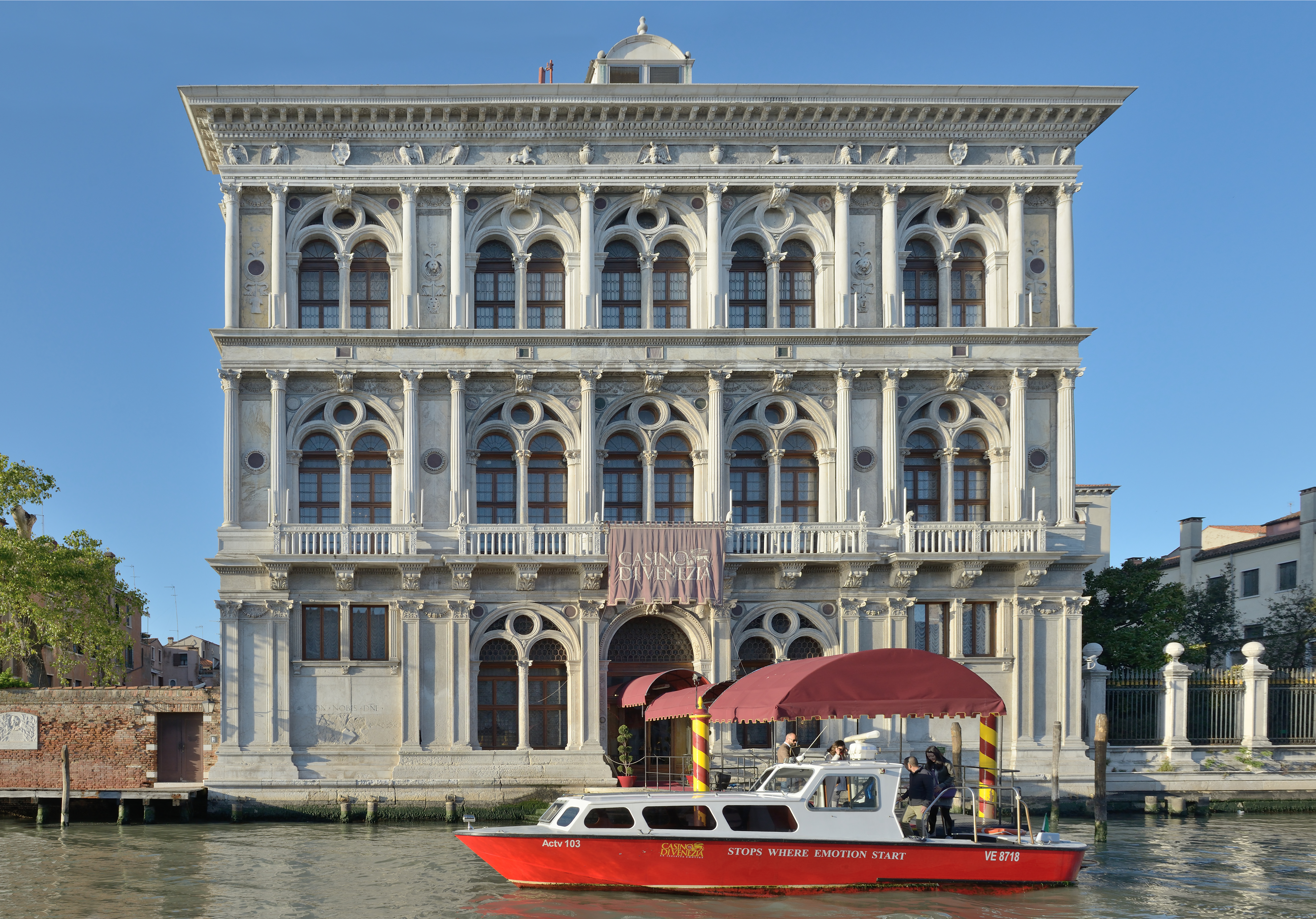
Creative Renaissance reinterpretation of the Classical order on the facade of the Ca' Vendramin Calergi, Venice, by Mauro Codussi, 1481–1509. At the top level, despite the Corinthian columns, the frieze is empty, except some eagles and two urns above each column, a playful reinterpretation of the triglyph that is above columns in the Doric order

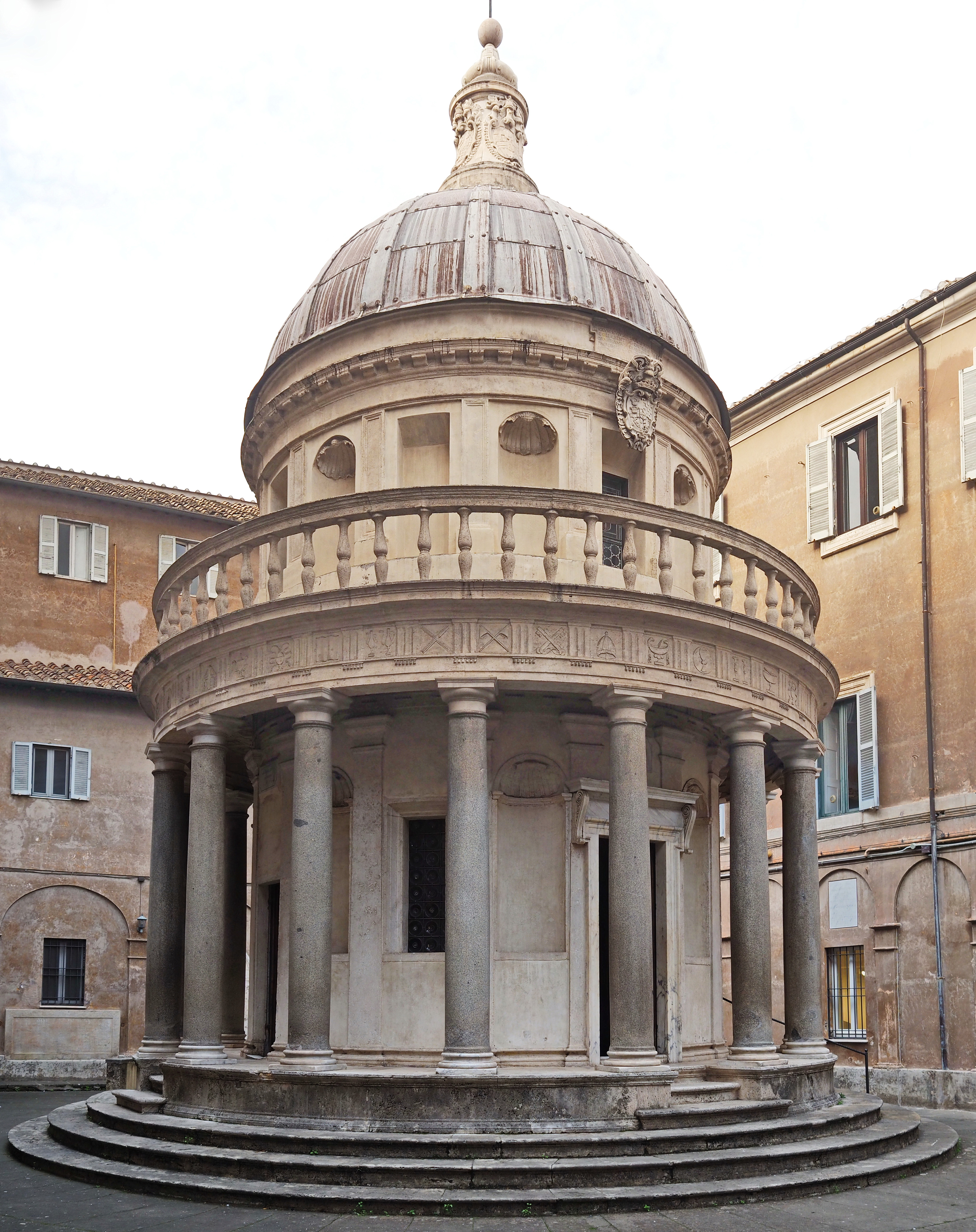
Renaissance Doric columns and entablature of The Tempietto, San Pietro in Montorio, Rome, by Donato Bramante, 1502

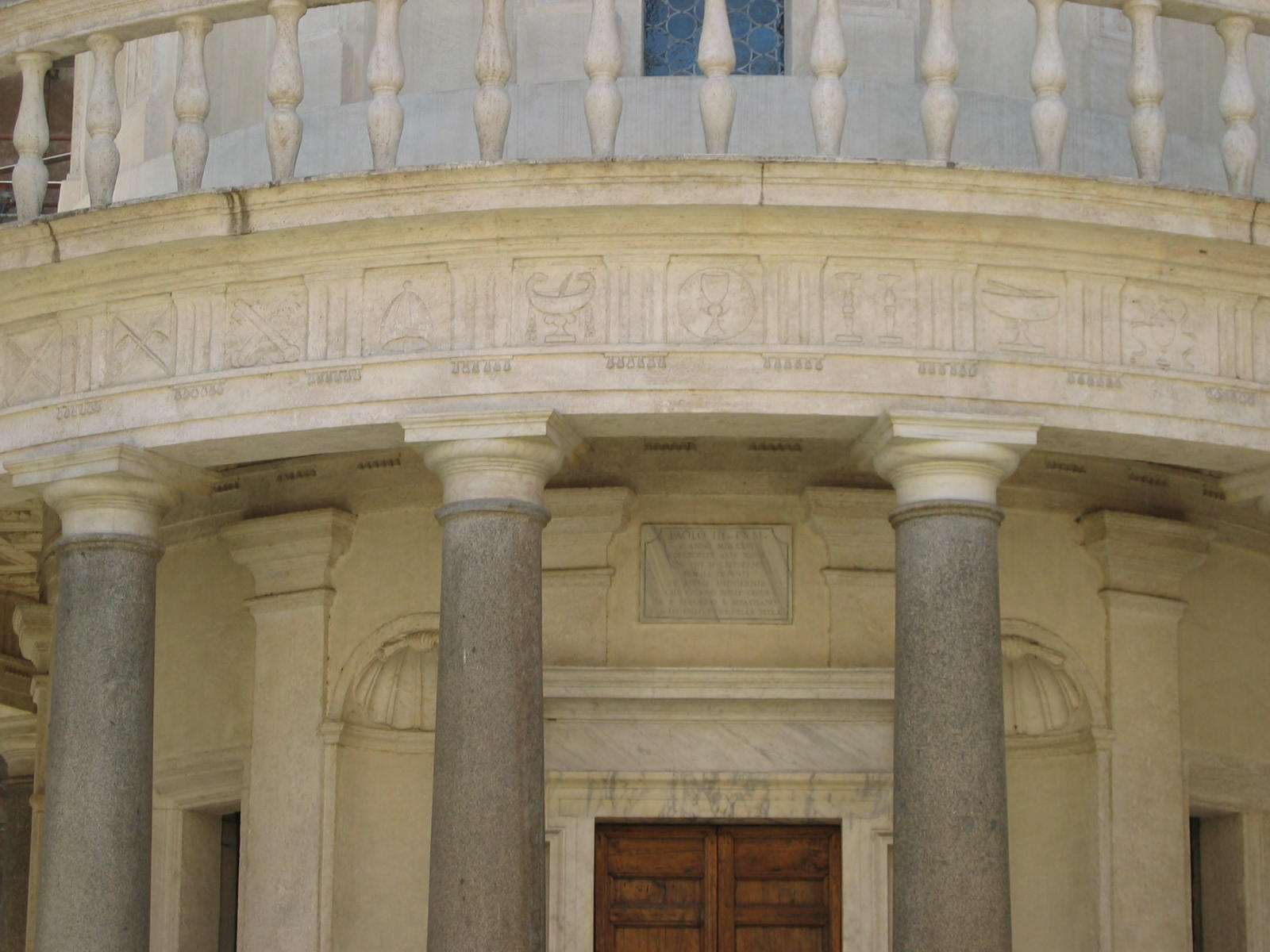
The frieze of the Tempietto, in which the pagan motifs, like the bucranium or the patera, that normally fill the metopes, were replaced with Christian liturgical instruments

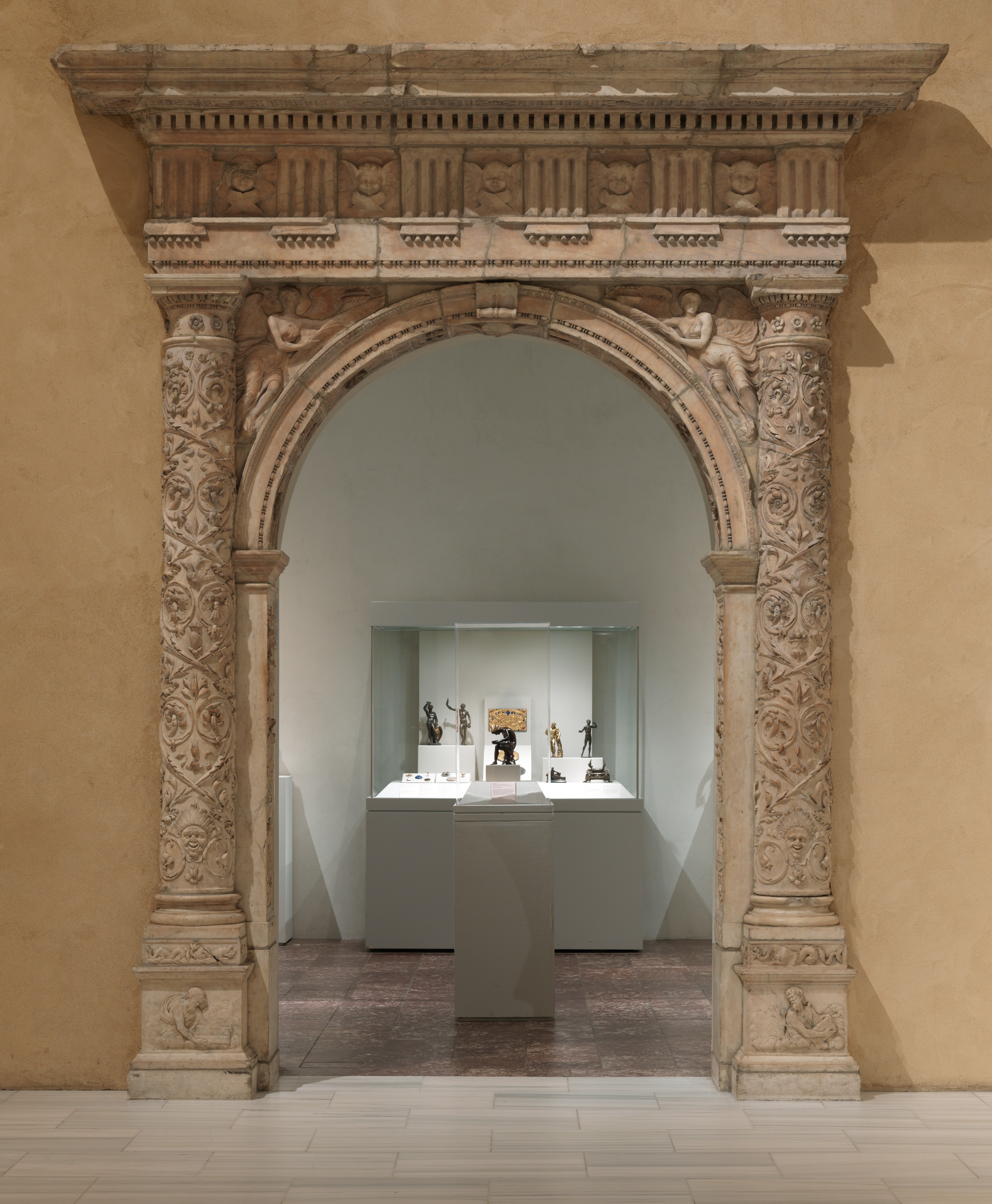
Renaissance Doric altar enframement, probably from Tuscany, Italy, c.1530–1550, marble, Metropolitan Museum of Art, New York City

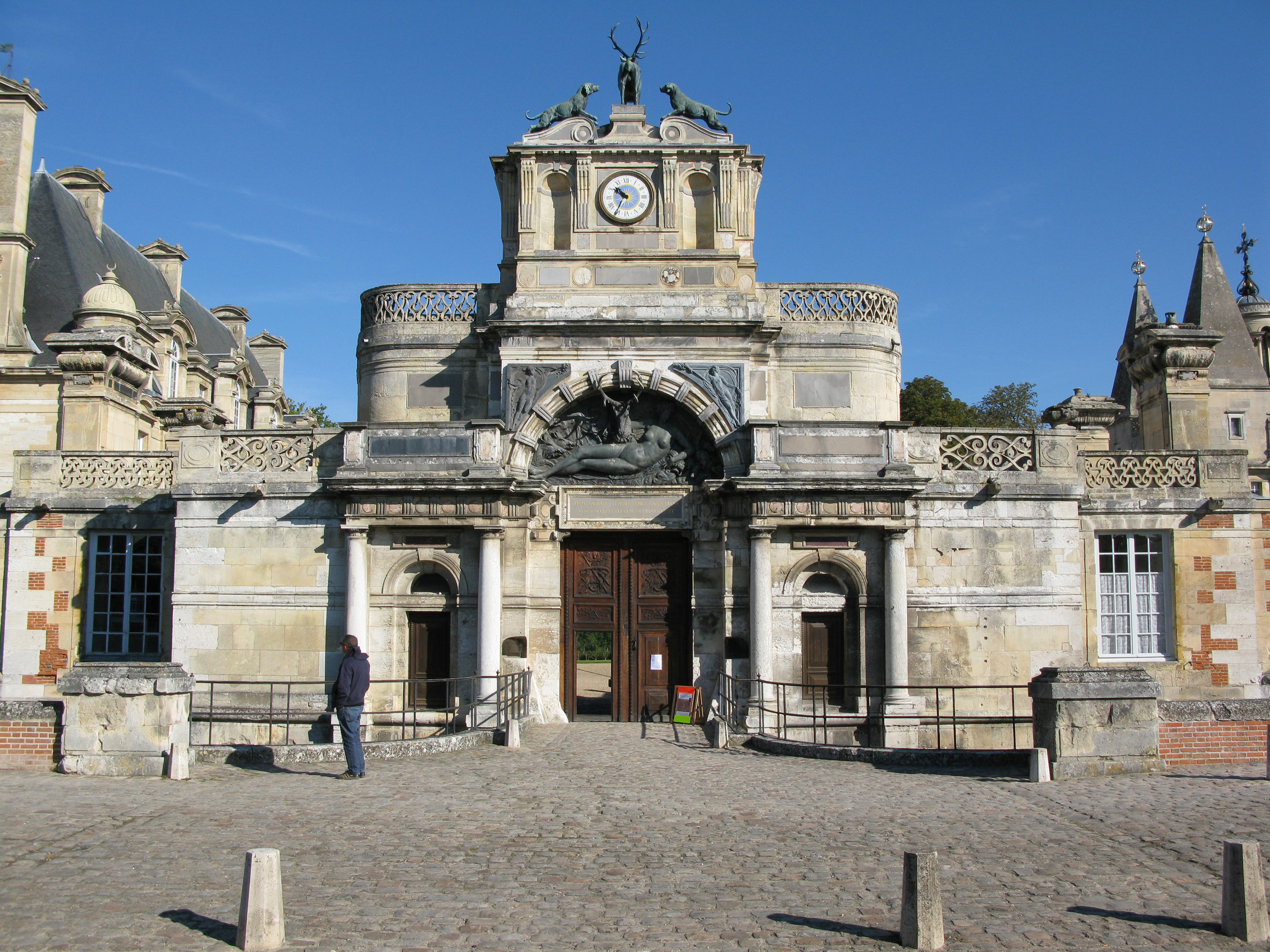
Renaissance Doric columns and entablature of the entrance gateway of the Château d'Anet, near Dreux, France, by Philibert de l'Orme, 1547–1552

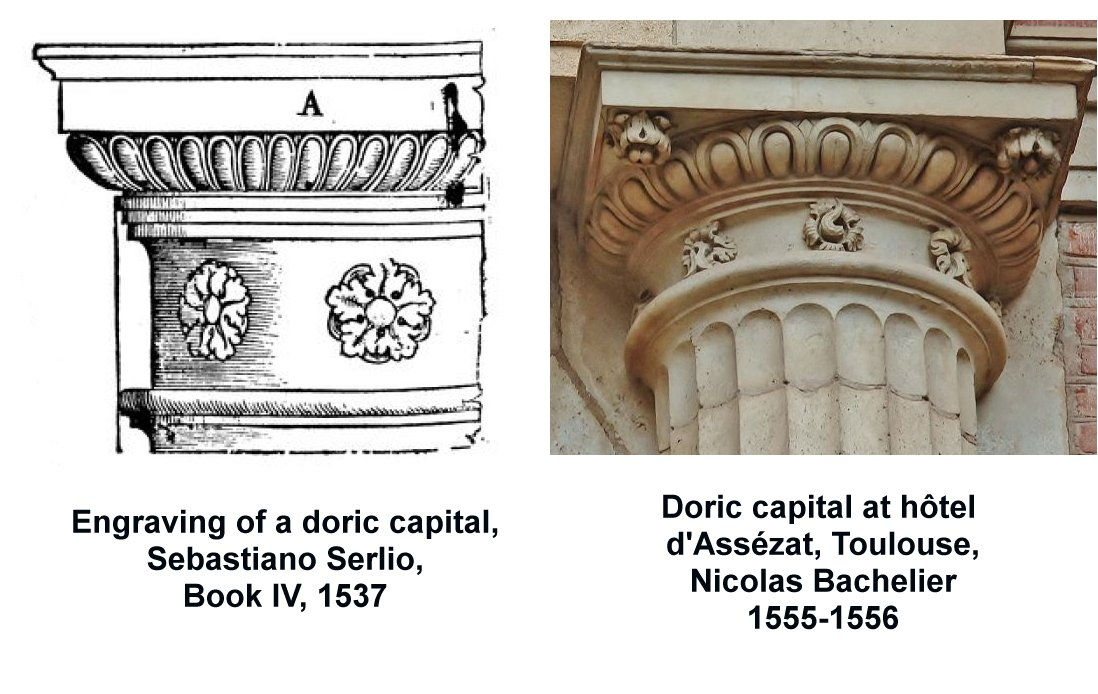
Renaissance Doric capital at Hôtel d'Assézat designed according to a model published by Sebastiano Serlio, France, 1555–1556

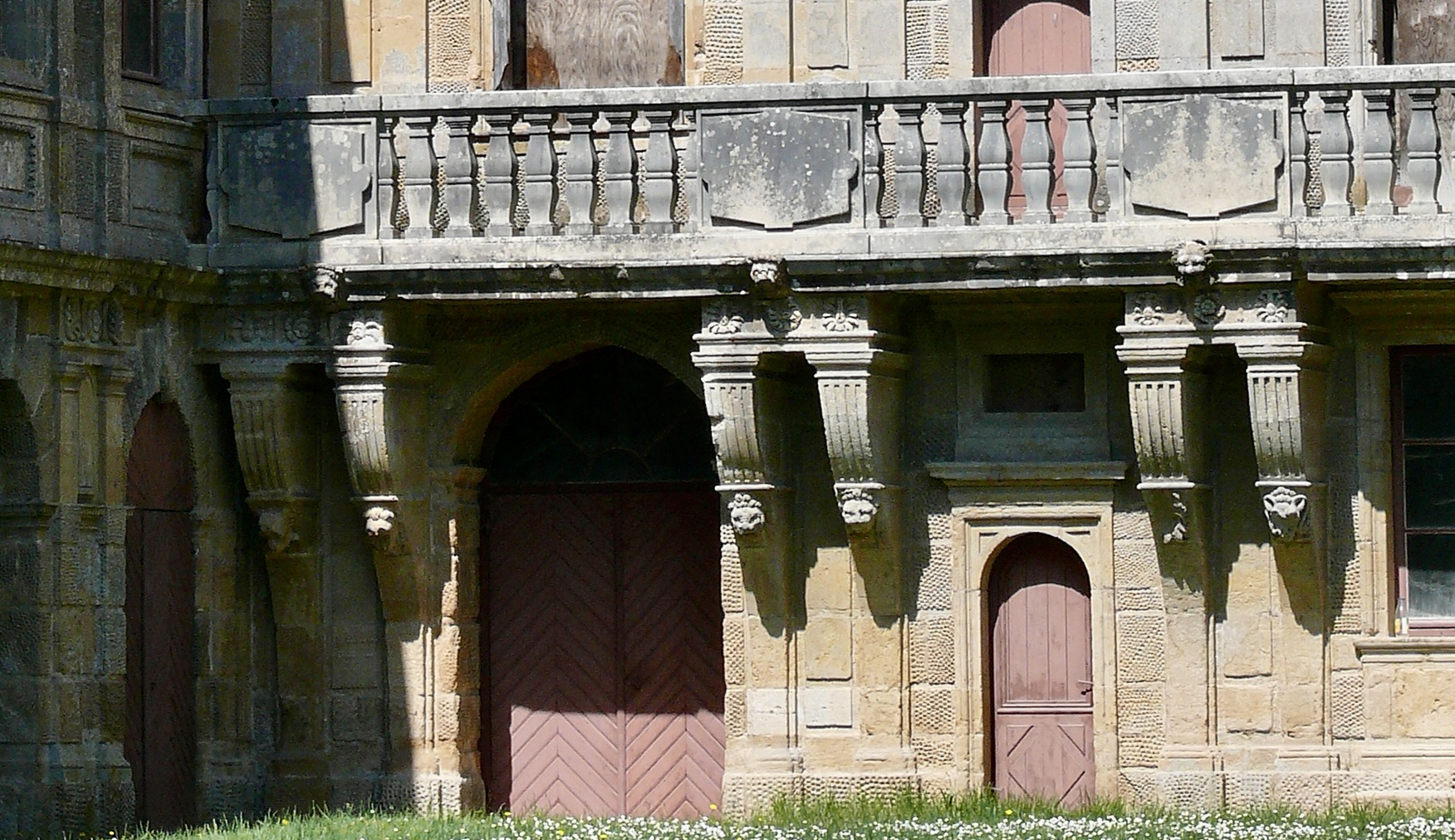
Renaissance combination of Doric pilasters and corbels of the Château du Pailly, Le Pailly, France, 1563–1573

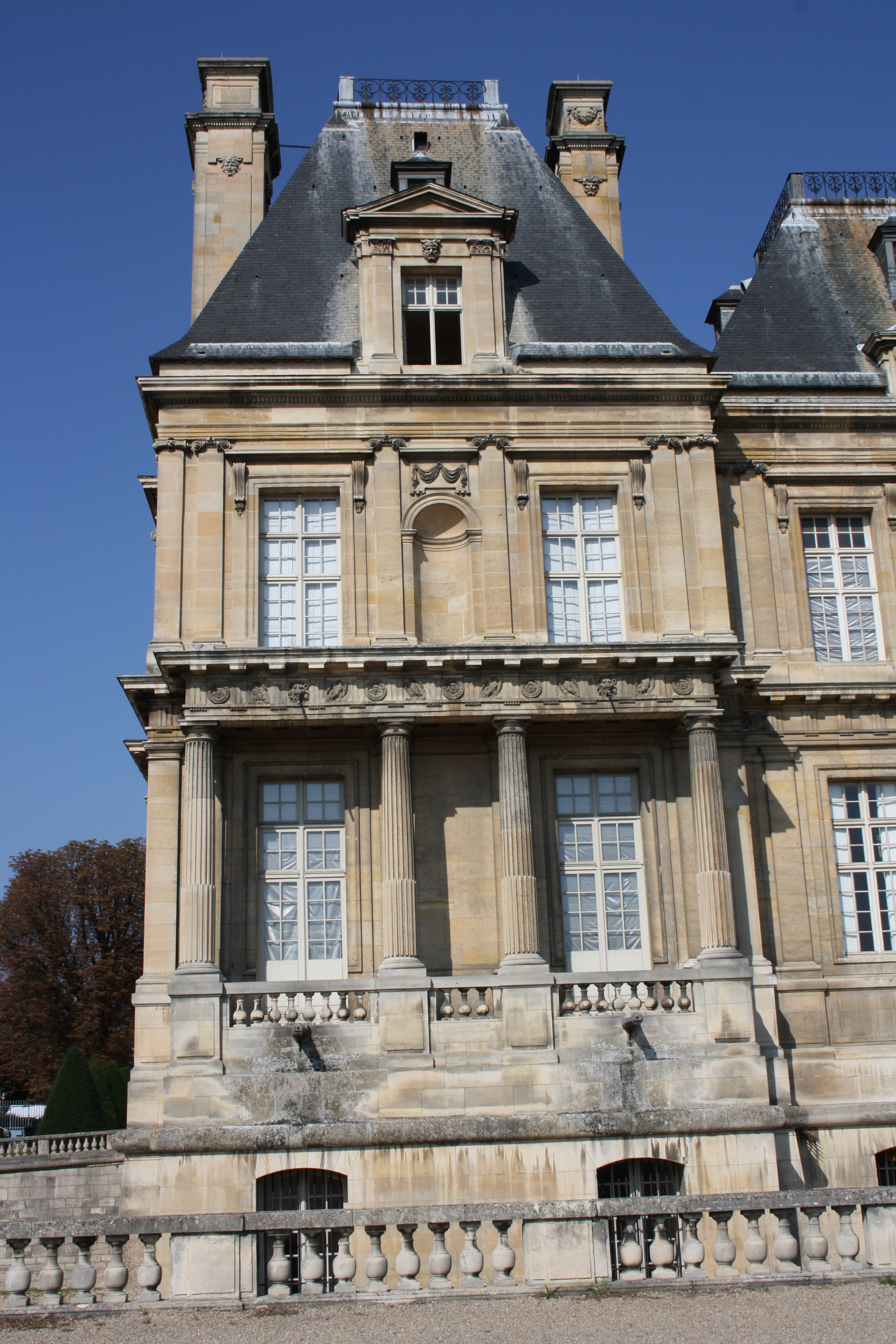
Baroque columns and entablature of the Château de Maisons, France, by François Mansart, 1630–1651

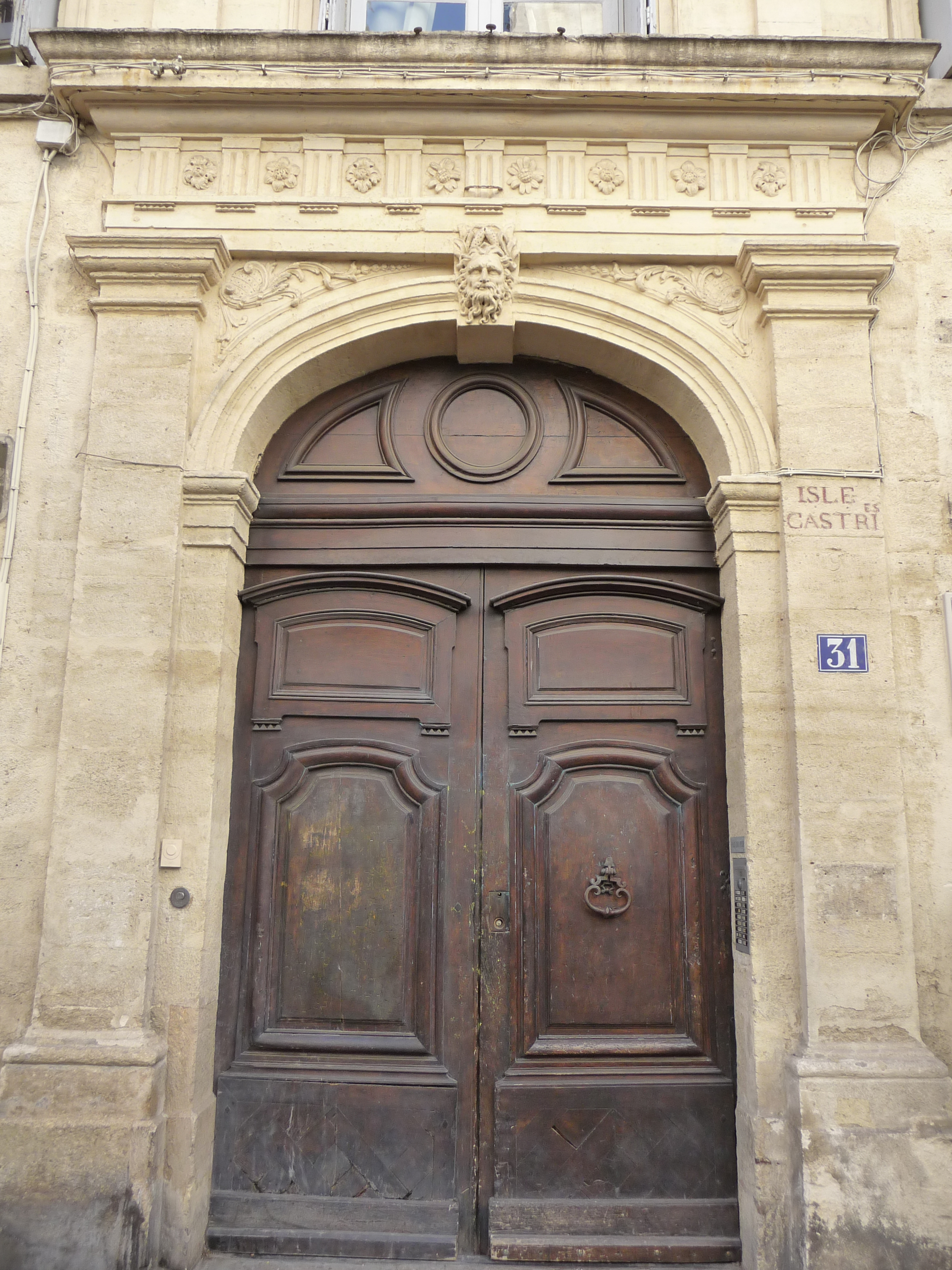
Baroque Doric pilasters and entablature on the facade of the Hôtel de Castries (Rue Saint-Guilhem no. 31), Montpellier, France, by Simon Levesville, 1647

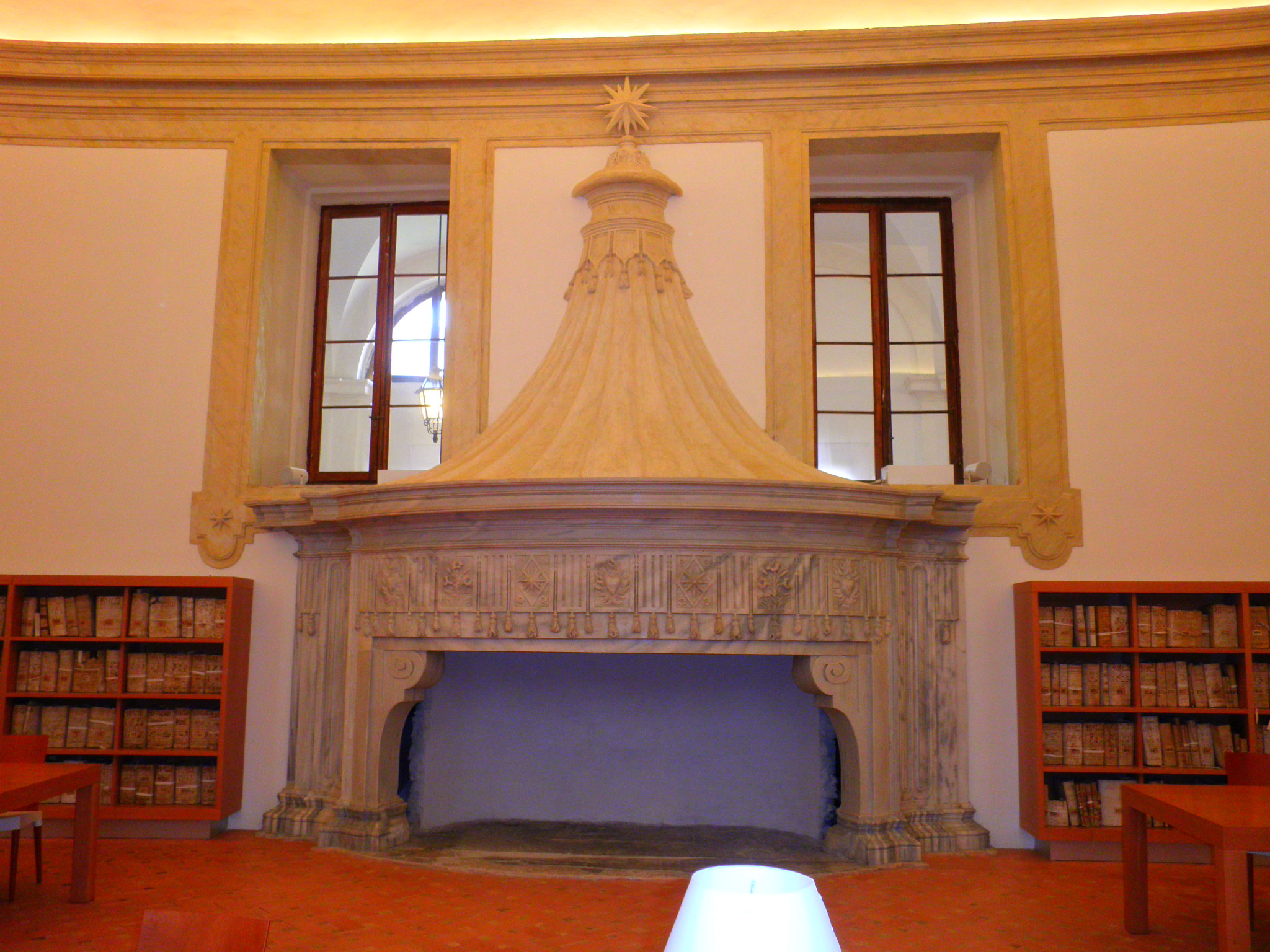
Chinoiserie reinterpretation of the Doric frieze on a fireplace in the oval room inside the Oratorio dei Filippini, Rome, by Francesco Borromini, 1637–1650

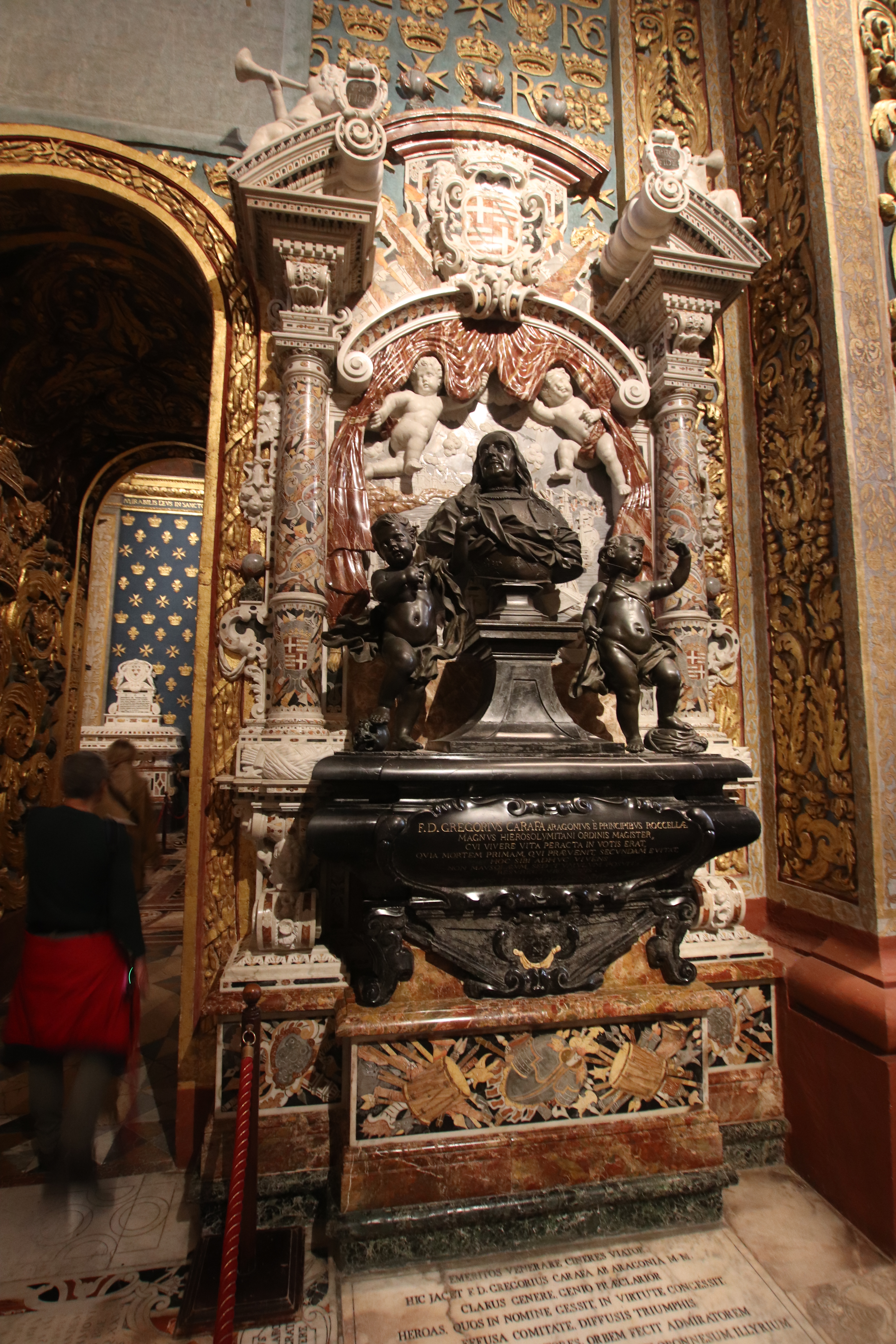
Baroque Doric columns with inlay of different types of stone, of the Funerary Monument of Gregorio Carafa, St John's Co-Cathedral, Valletta, Malta, unknown sculptor, c.1690

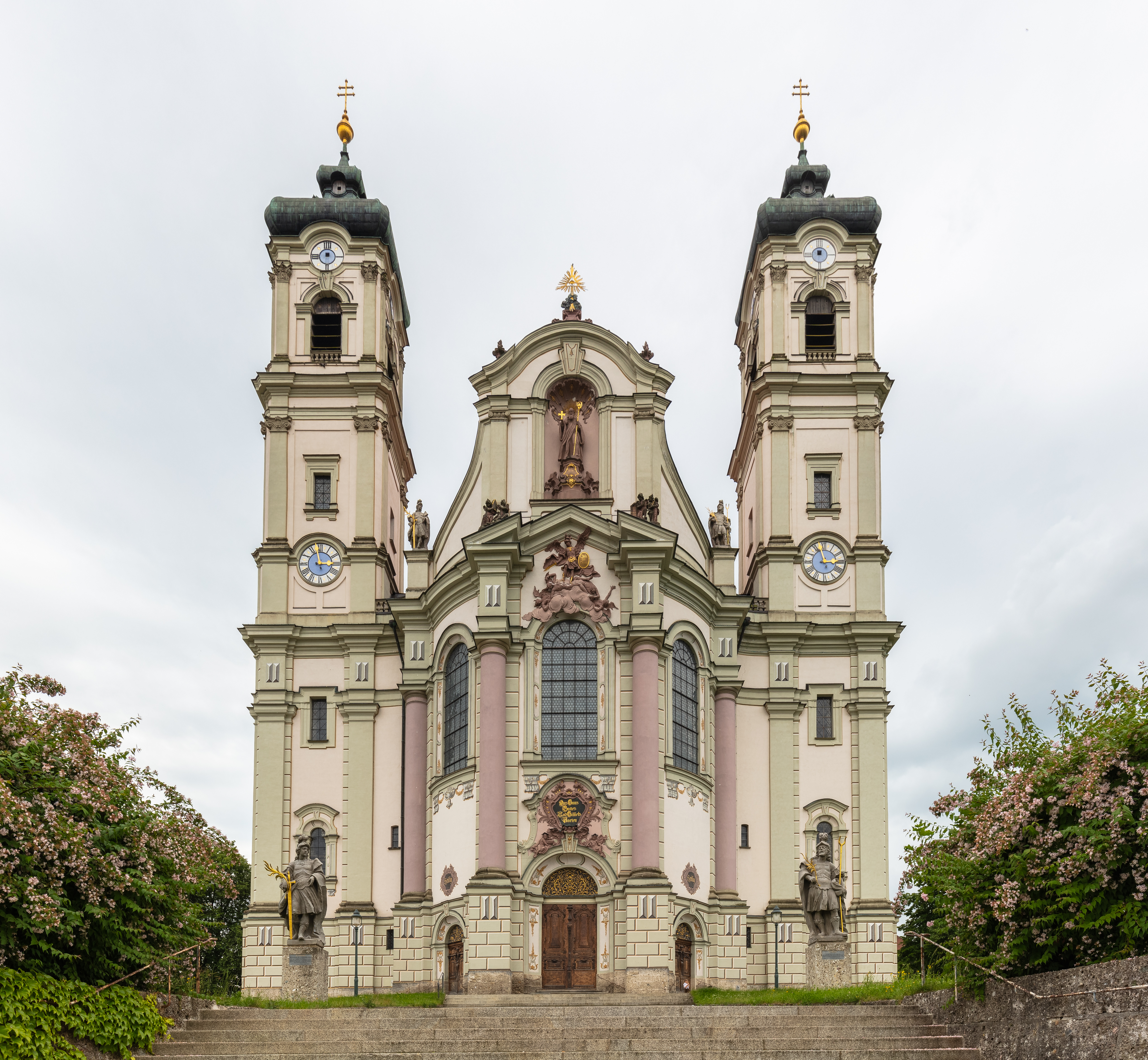
Rococo Doric columns and pilasters on the facade of the abbey church of Ottobeuren, Germany, by Johann Michael Fischer, 1748–1754

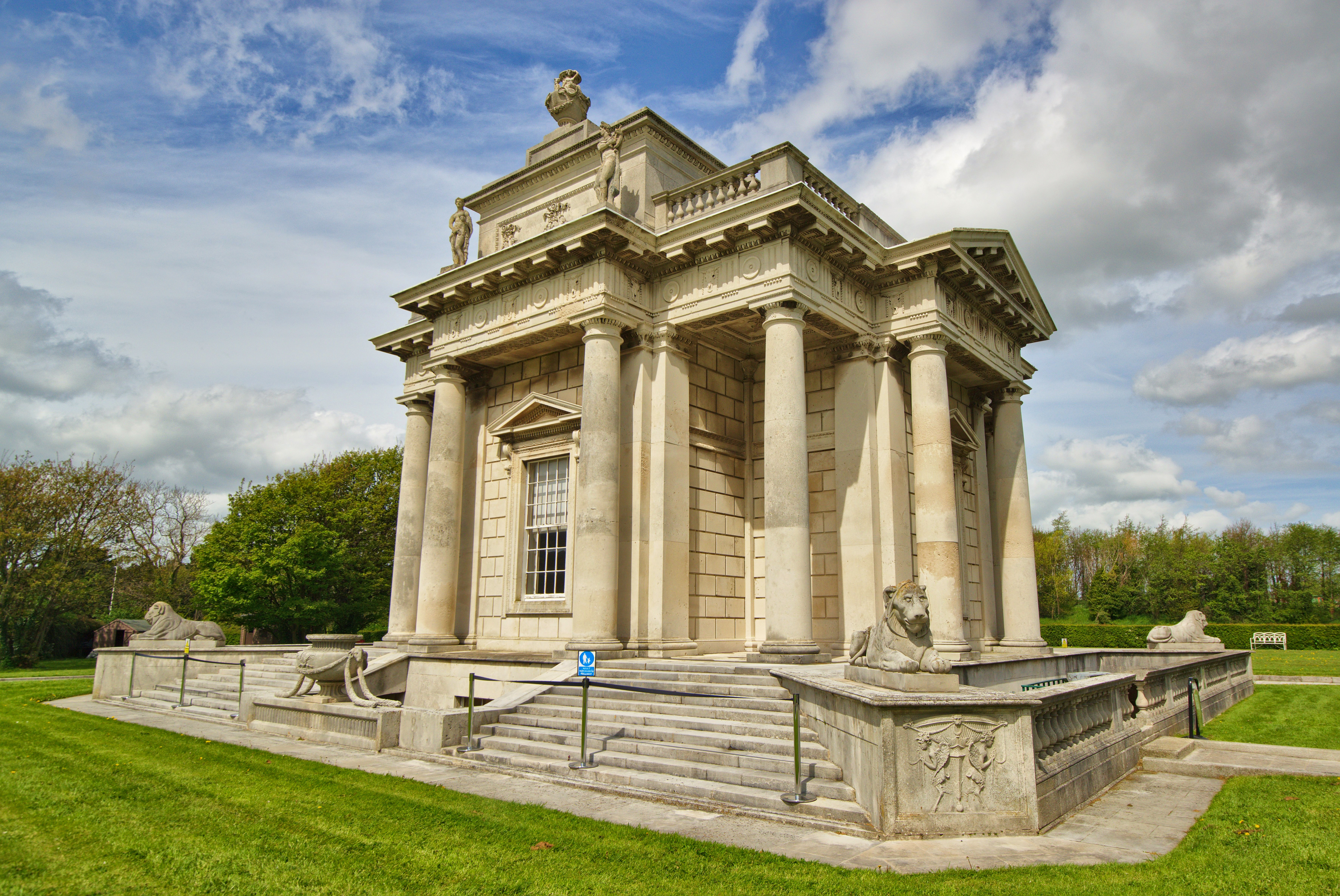
Neoclassical columns and entablature of the Casino at the Marino House, near Dublin, Ireland, by William Chambers, 1758–1776

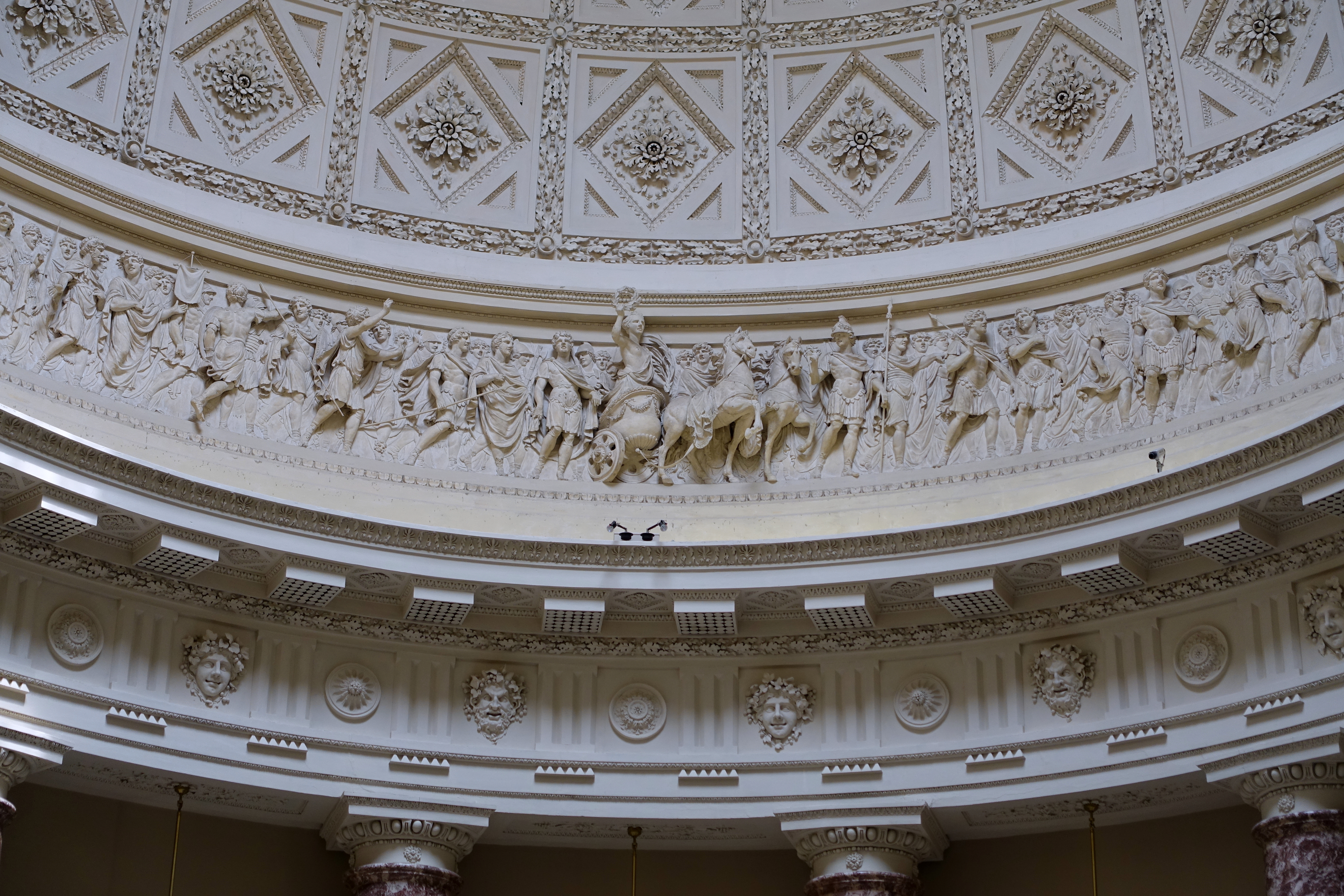
Neoclassical Doric frieze with circular motifs in the metopes that alternate with mascarons, in the Marble Saloon of the Stowe House, Stowe, Buckinghamshire, UK, probably by Vincenzo Valdrè, 1775–1788

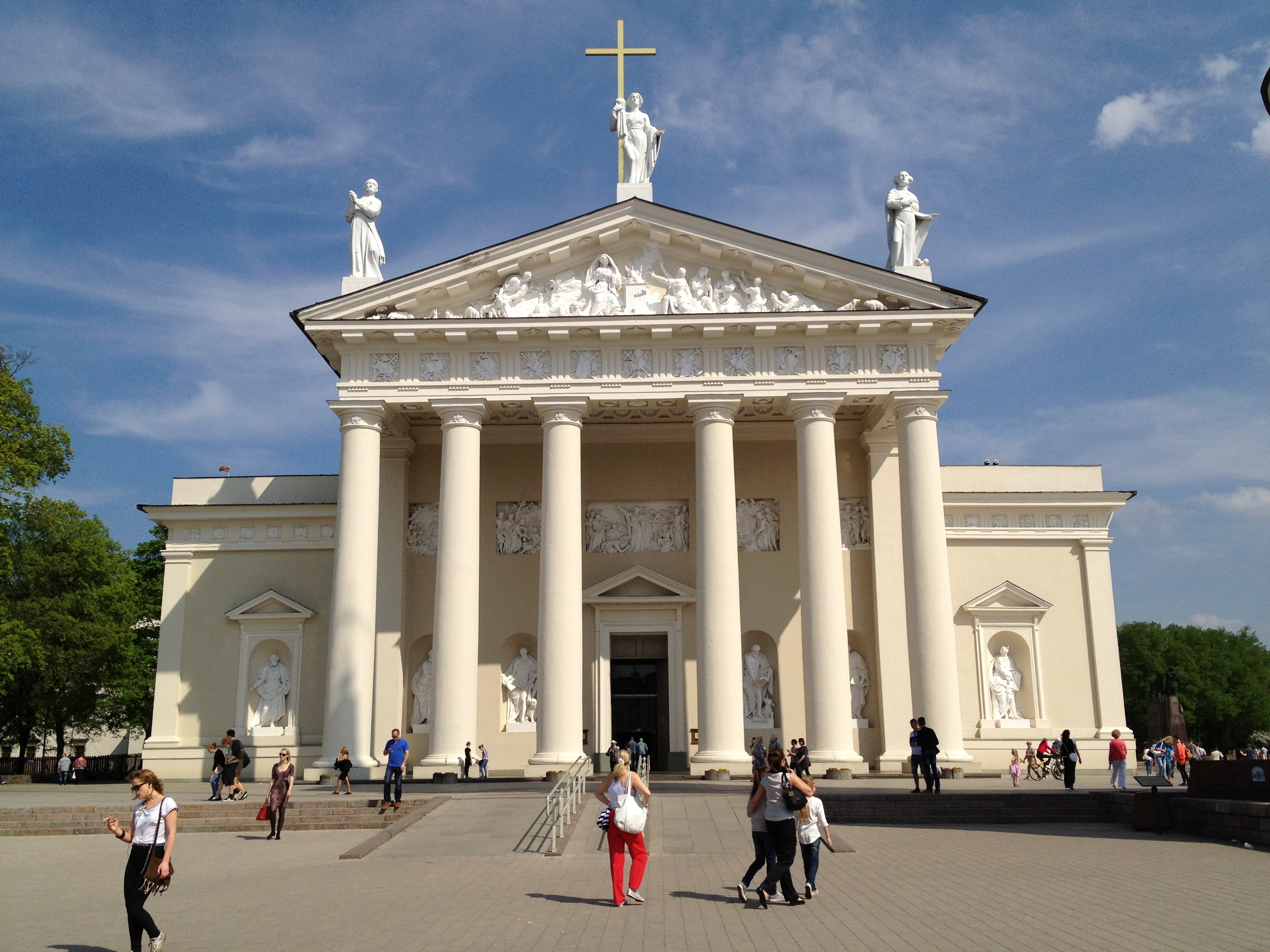
Neoclassical Doric columns of the Vilnius Cathedral, Vilnius, Lithuania, by Laurynas Gucevičius, 1779–1783

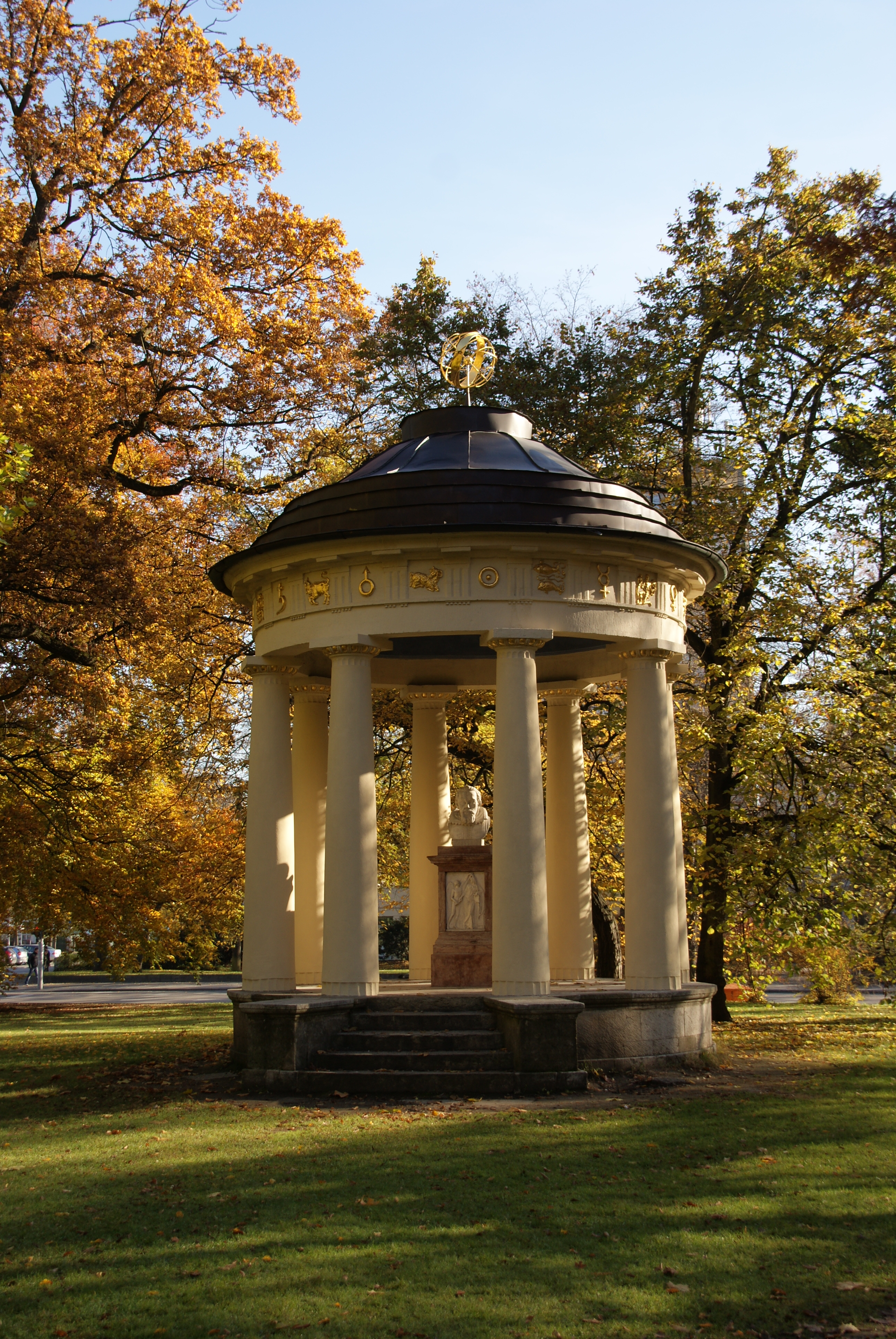
Greek Revival columns of the Johannes Kepler Monuments, Regensburg, Germany, inspired by those of the Temple of the Delians in Delos, designed by Emanuel Herigoyen and sculpted by Philipp Jakob Scheffauer and Johann Heinrich von Dannecker, 1808

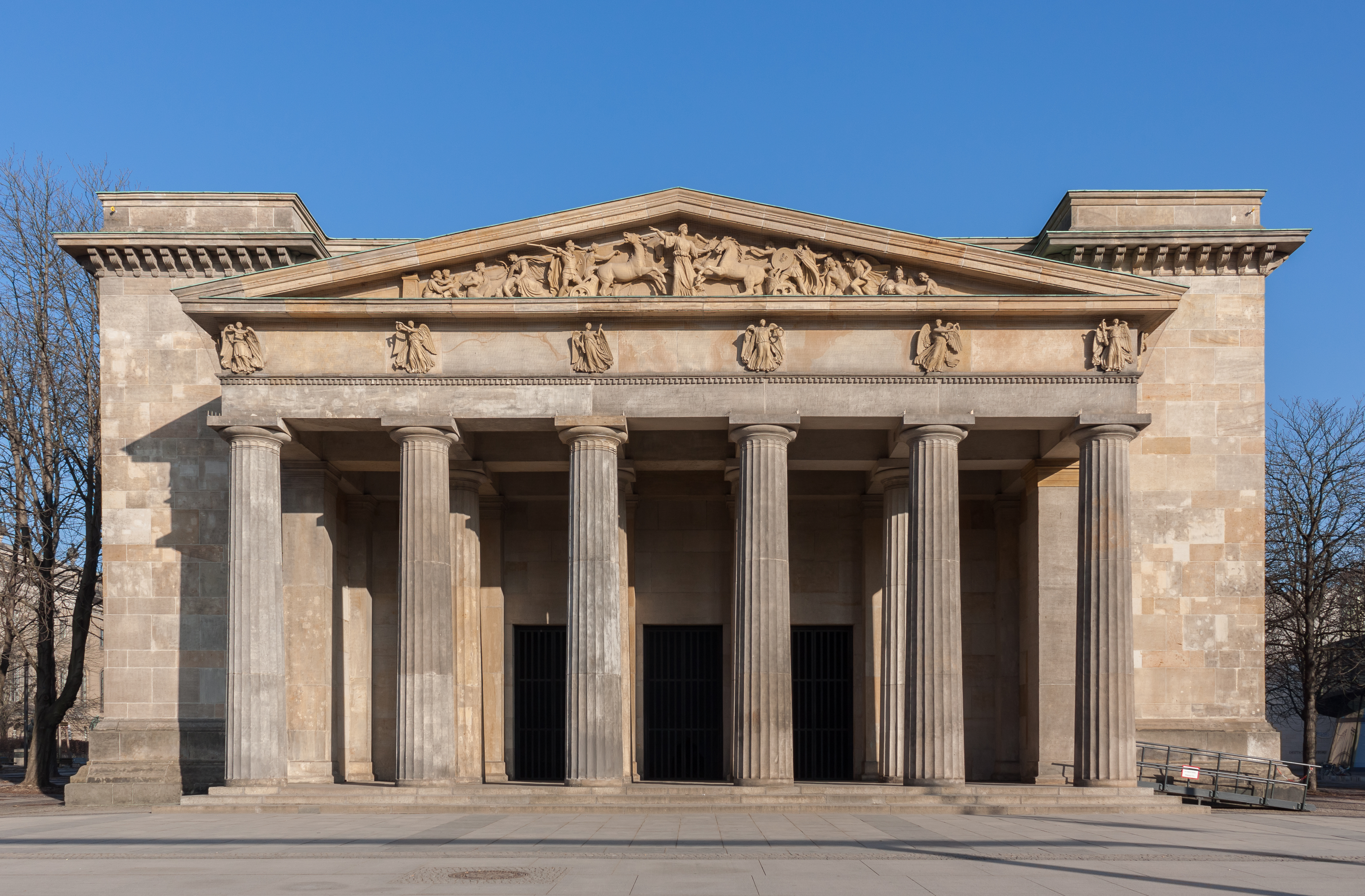
Greek Revival columns of the Neue Wache, Berlin, where the triglyphs were replaced by Nike figures, by Karl Friedrich Schinkel and Salomo Sachs, 1816

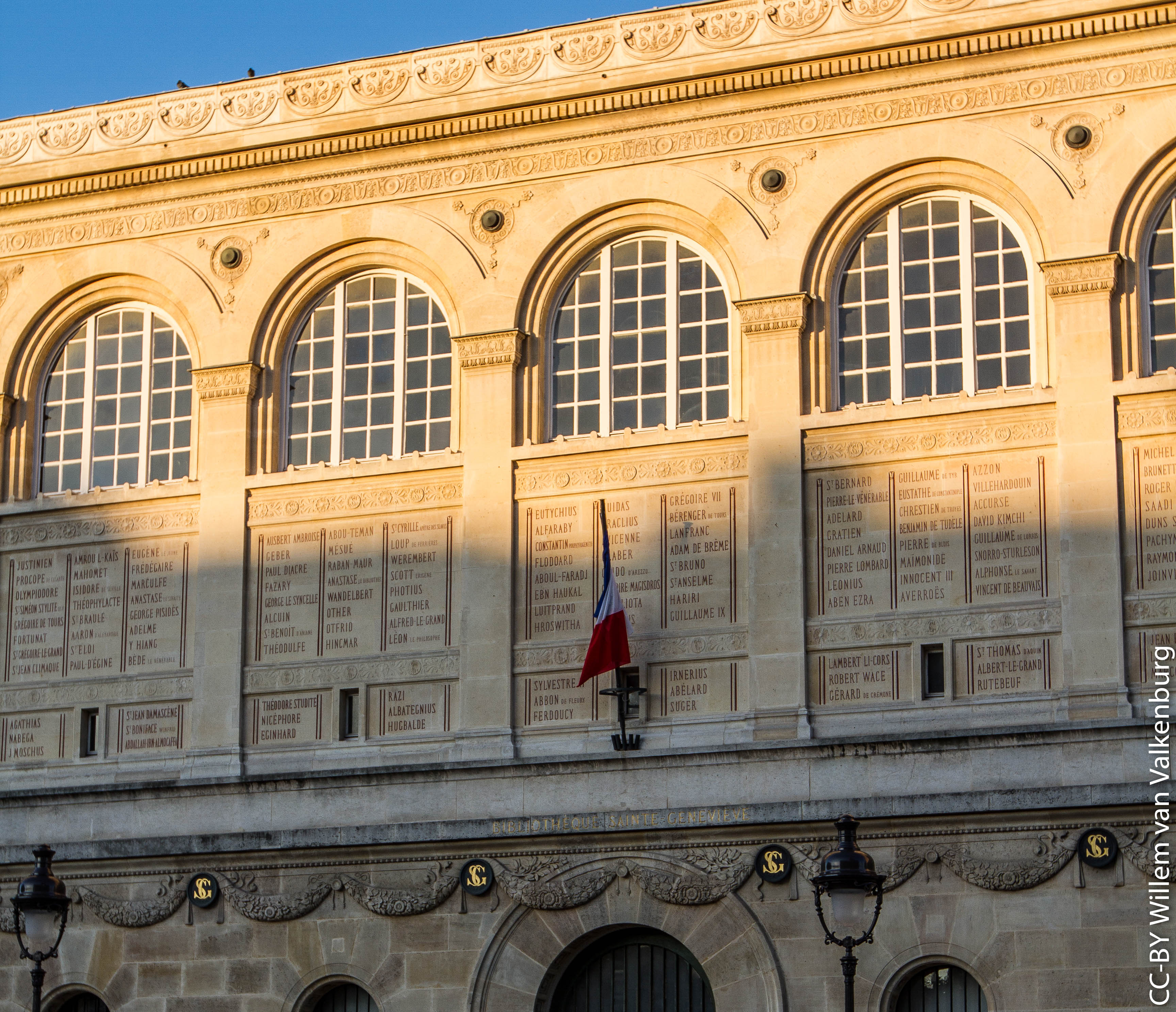
Neoclassical Doric pilasters with arches on the entrance front façade of the Sainte-Geneviève Library, Paris, designed by Henri Labrouste in 1838–1839, built in 1834–1850

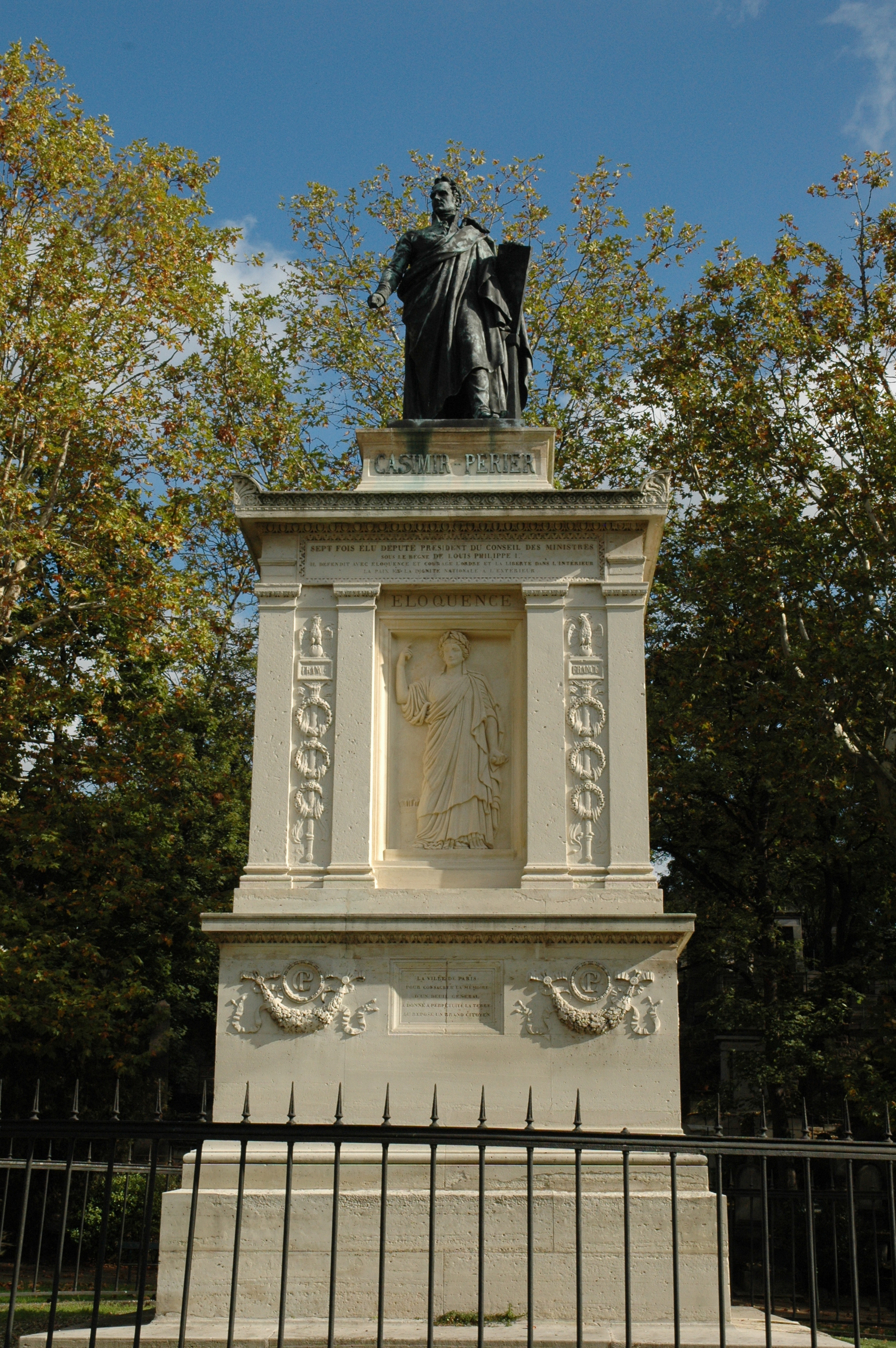
Neoclassical Doric pilasters on the Grave of Casimir Pierre Perier, Père-Lachaise Cemetery, Paris, designed by Achille Leclère, and sculpted by François-Joseph Bosio and Jean-Pierre Cortot, 1837

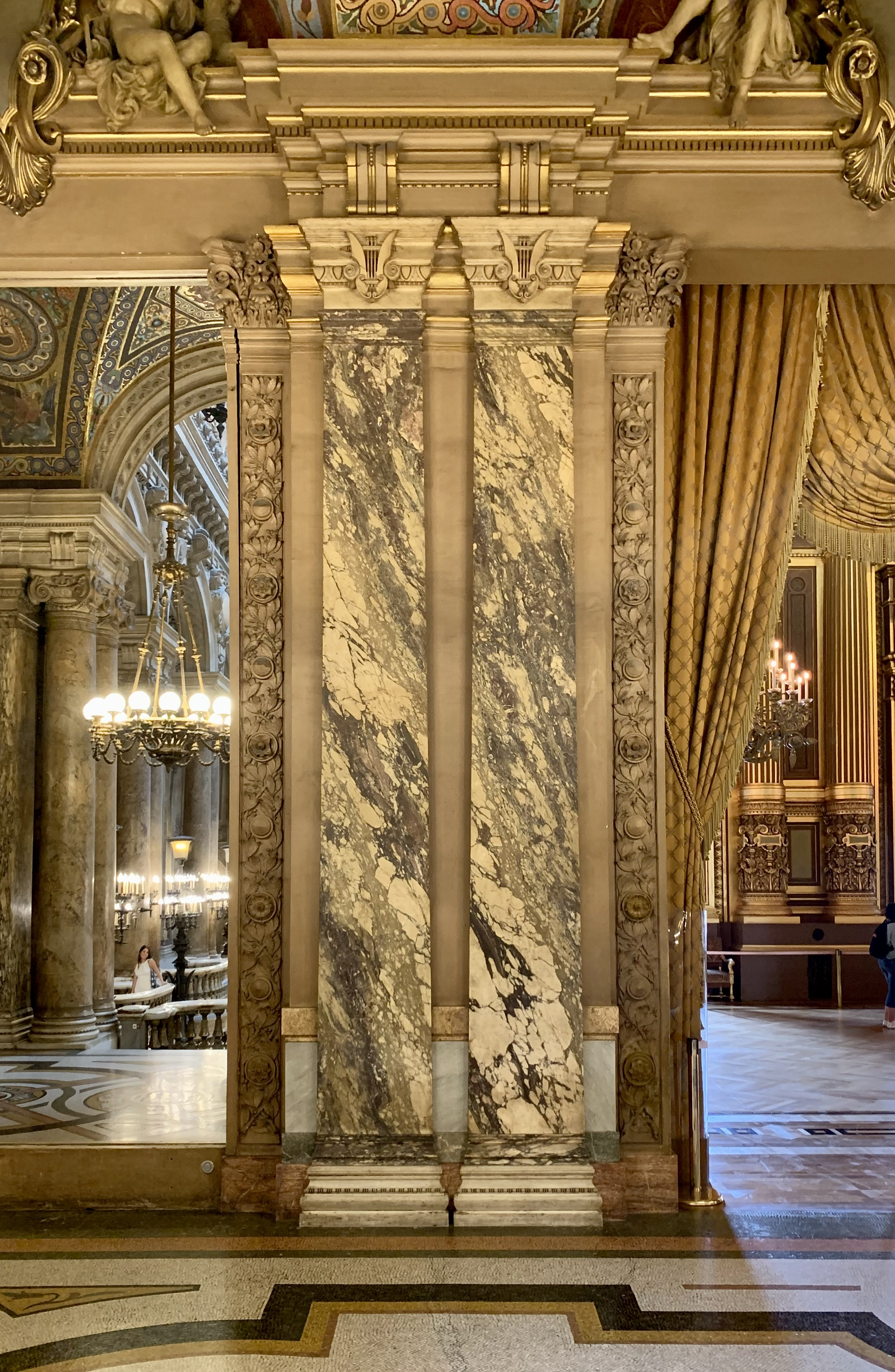
Beaux Arts Doric pilasters in the avant-foyer of the Palais Garnier, Paris, by Charles Garnier, 1861–1874

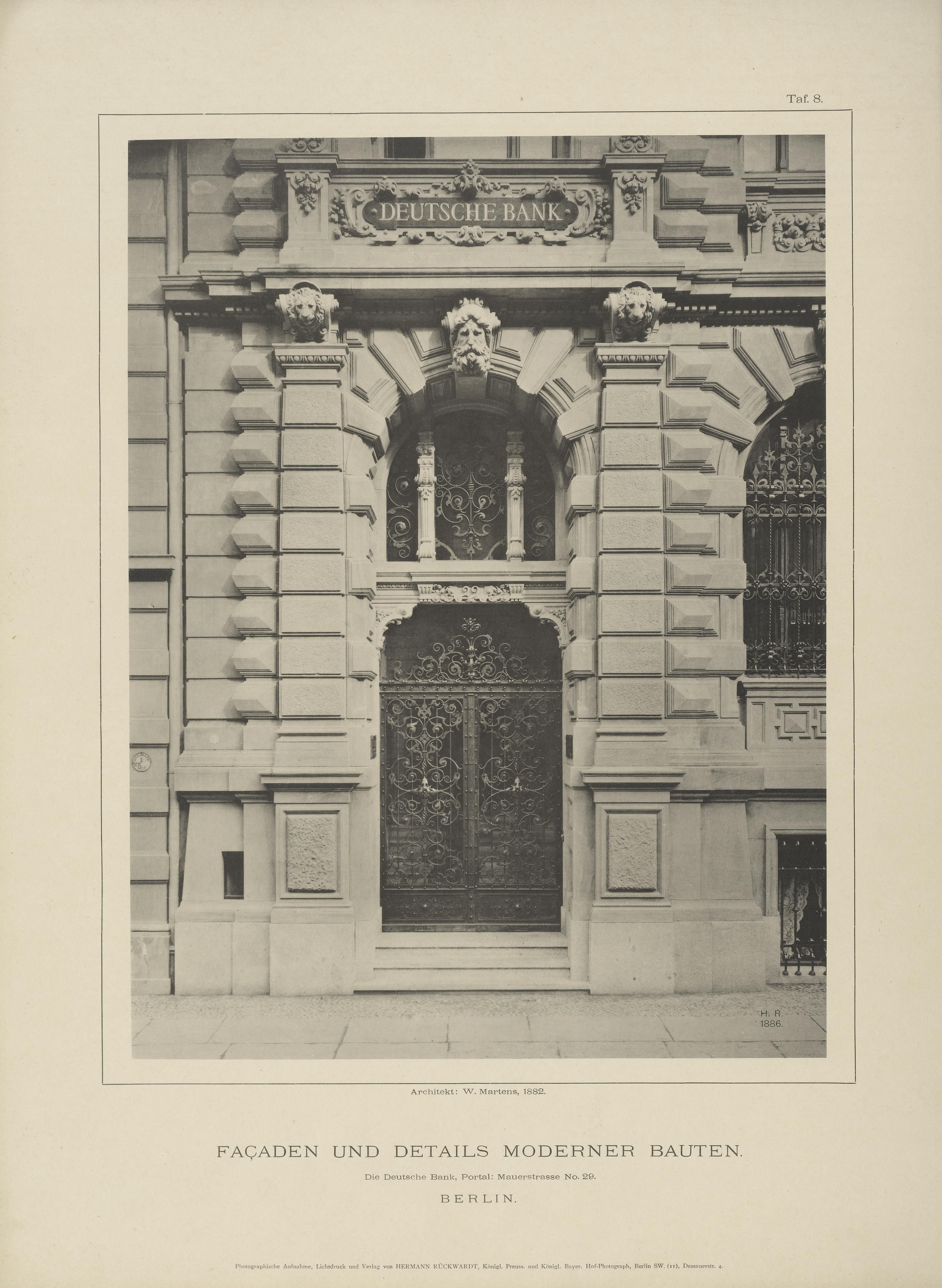
Renaissance Revival Doric pilasters with bossages on them, of the Deutsche Bank (Mauerstraße no. 29), Berlin, by W. Martens, 1882

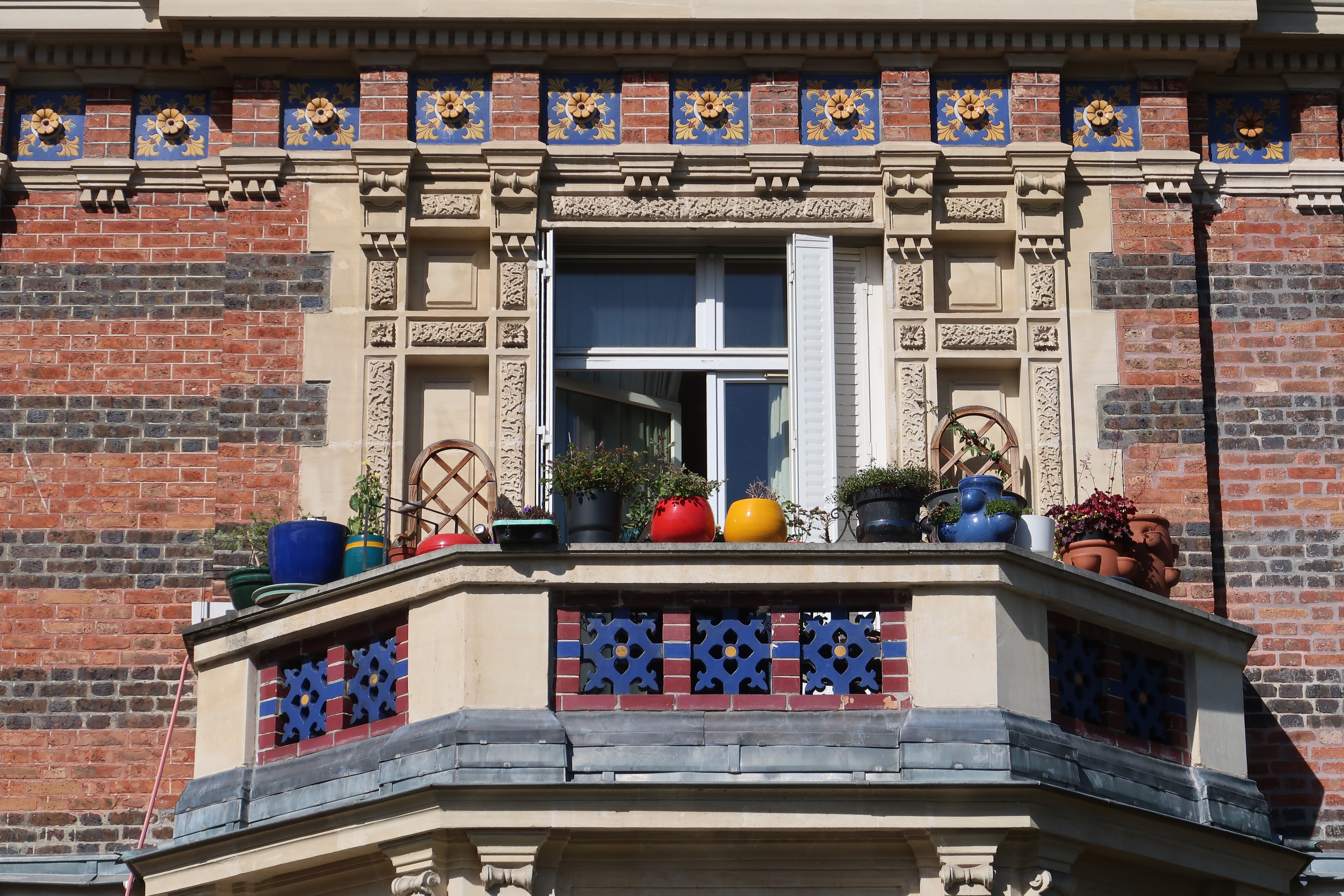
Eclectic façade with triglyphs and metopes of the Suriname Embassy (Rue du Ranelagh no. 94), Paris, unknown architect, 1885

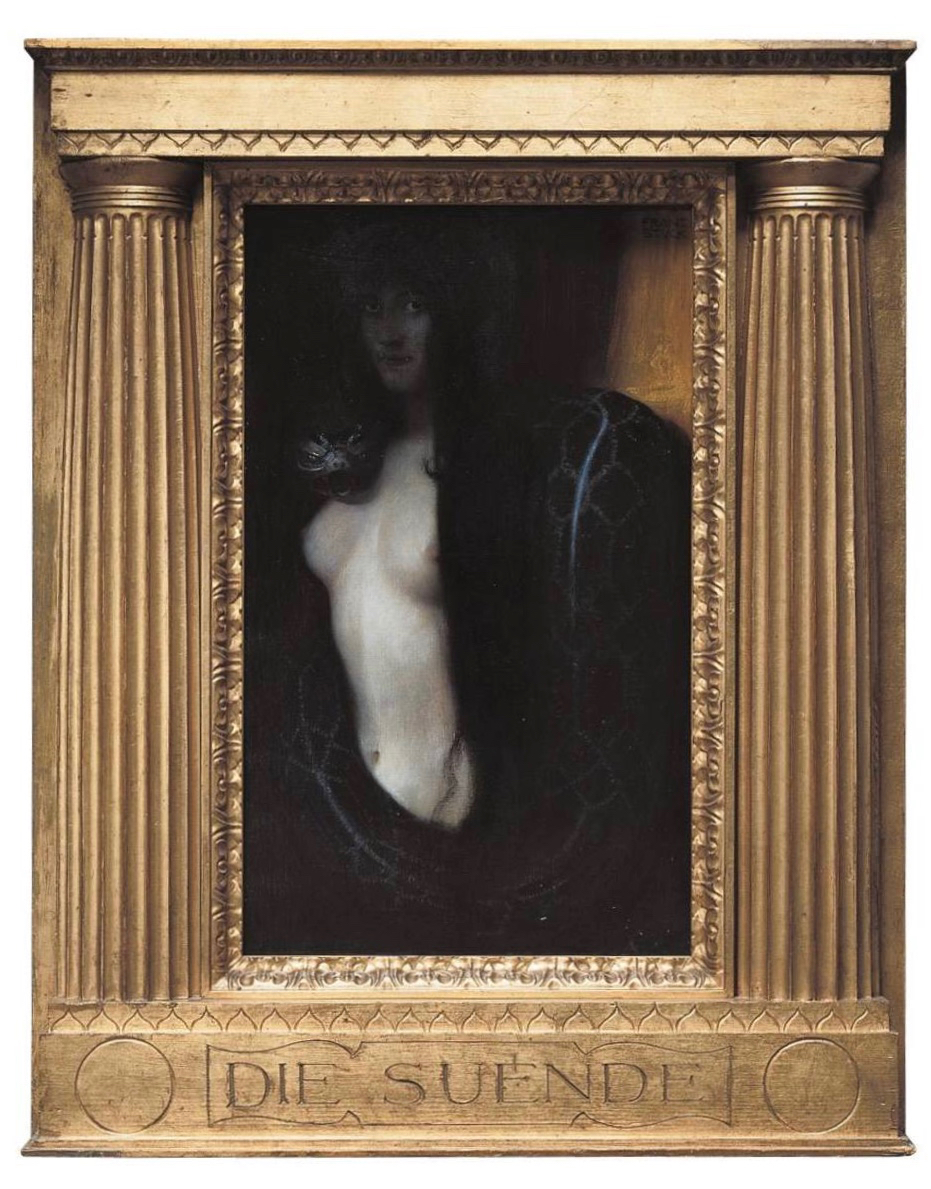
Vienna Secession Doric columns on the frame of Die Sünde, painted by Franz Stuck, 1893, gilt wood and oil on canvas

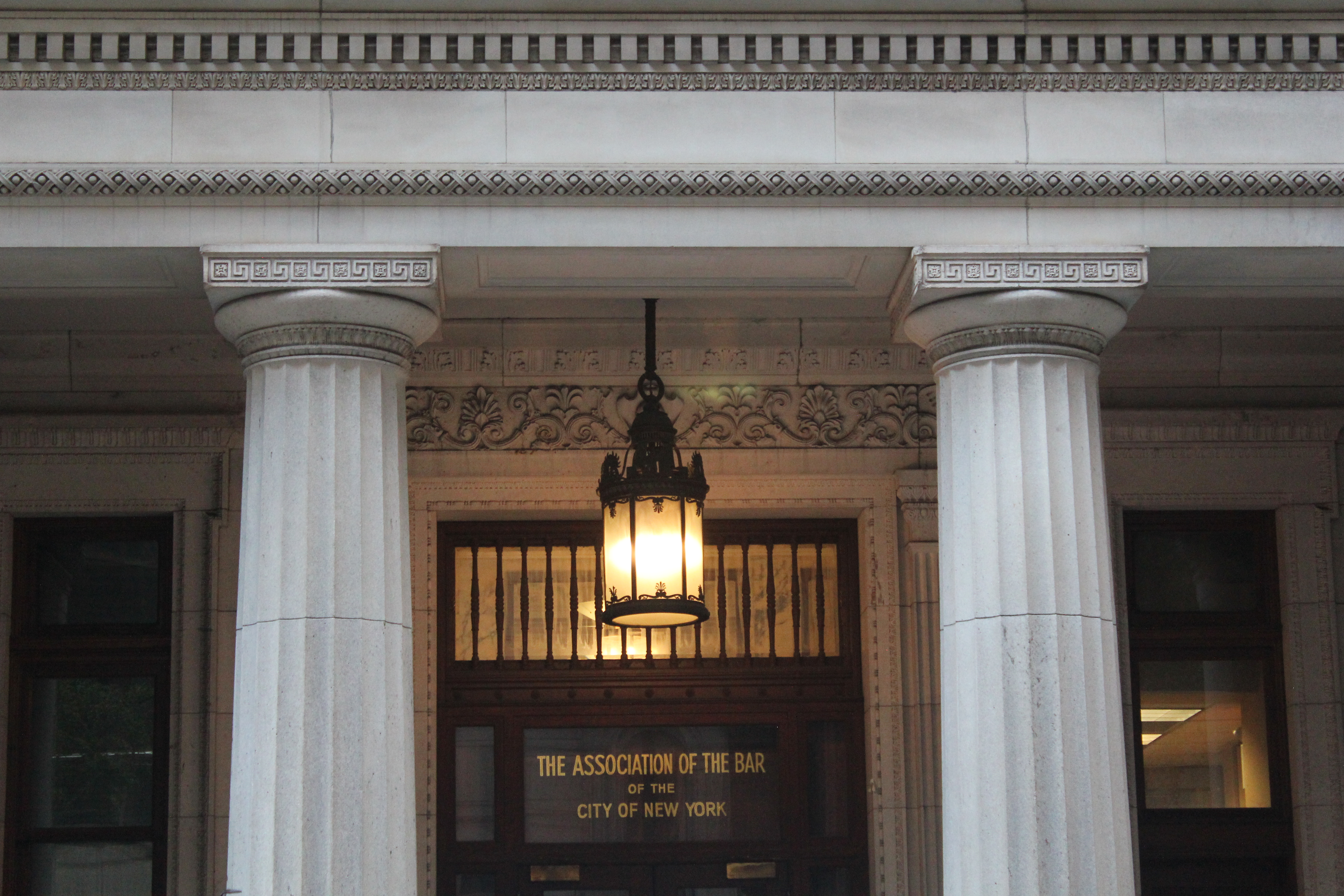
Greek Revival columns at the entrance of the House of the New York City Bar Association, New York City, inspired by the one from the Temple of Hera I at Paestum, but decorated with meanders on the abacuses and bands of compressed leafs that are a little more complex and bases you would never see on Ancient Greek Doric columns (not visible in this photo), by Cyrus Eidlitz, 1895

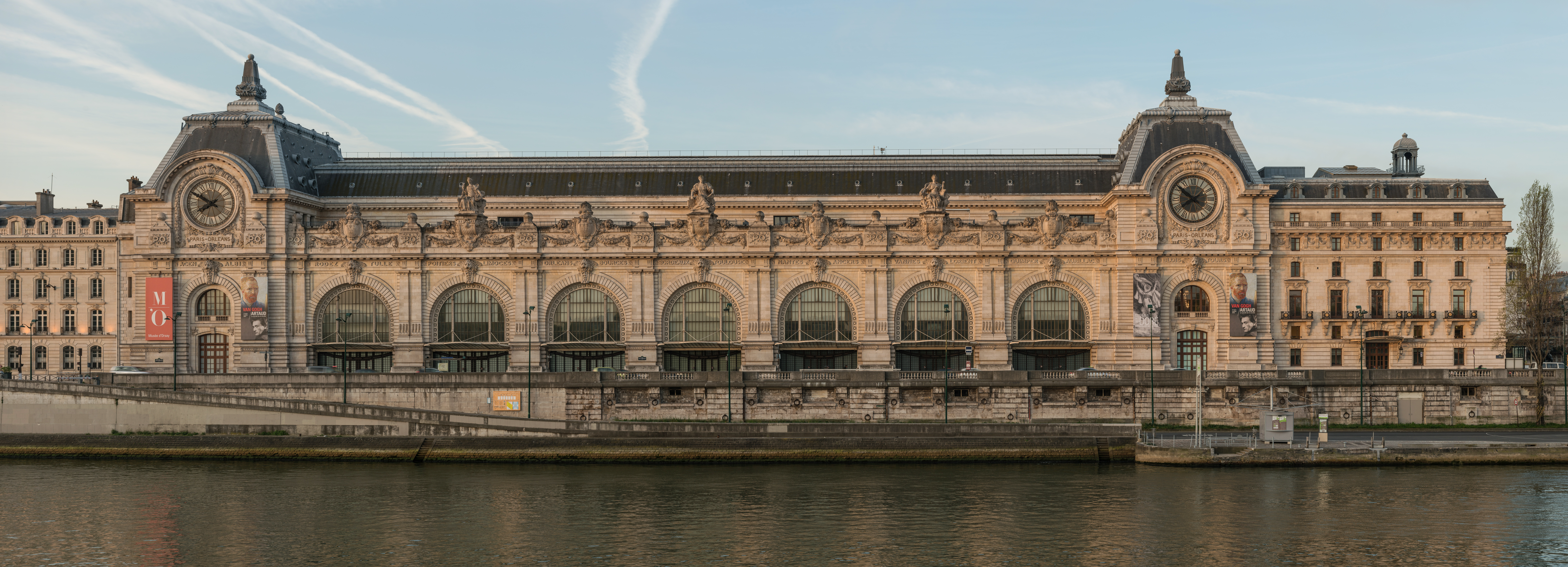
Beaux Arts Doric pilasters on the façade of the Gare d'Orsay, Paris, designed by Victor Laloux in c.1896–1897, and built in 1898–1900

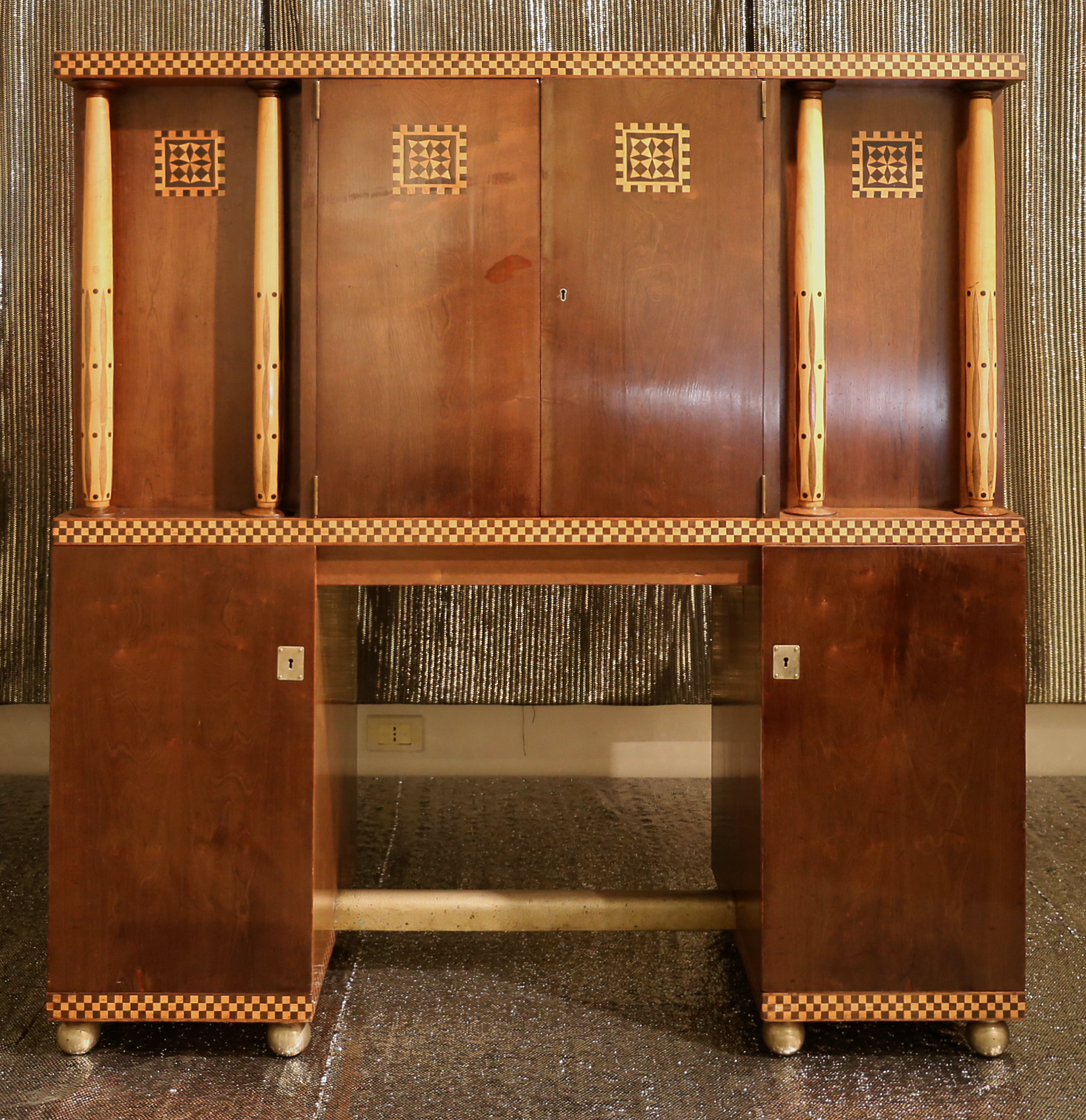
Vienna Secession Doric columns on a dresser, by Leopold Bauer, 1900–1902, various types of wood, in a temporary exhibition called Il Liberty e la rivoluzione europea delle arti at the Museum of Decorative Arts in Prague

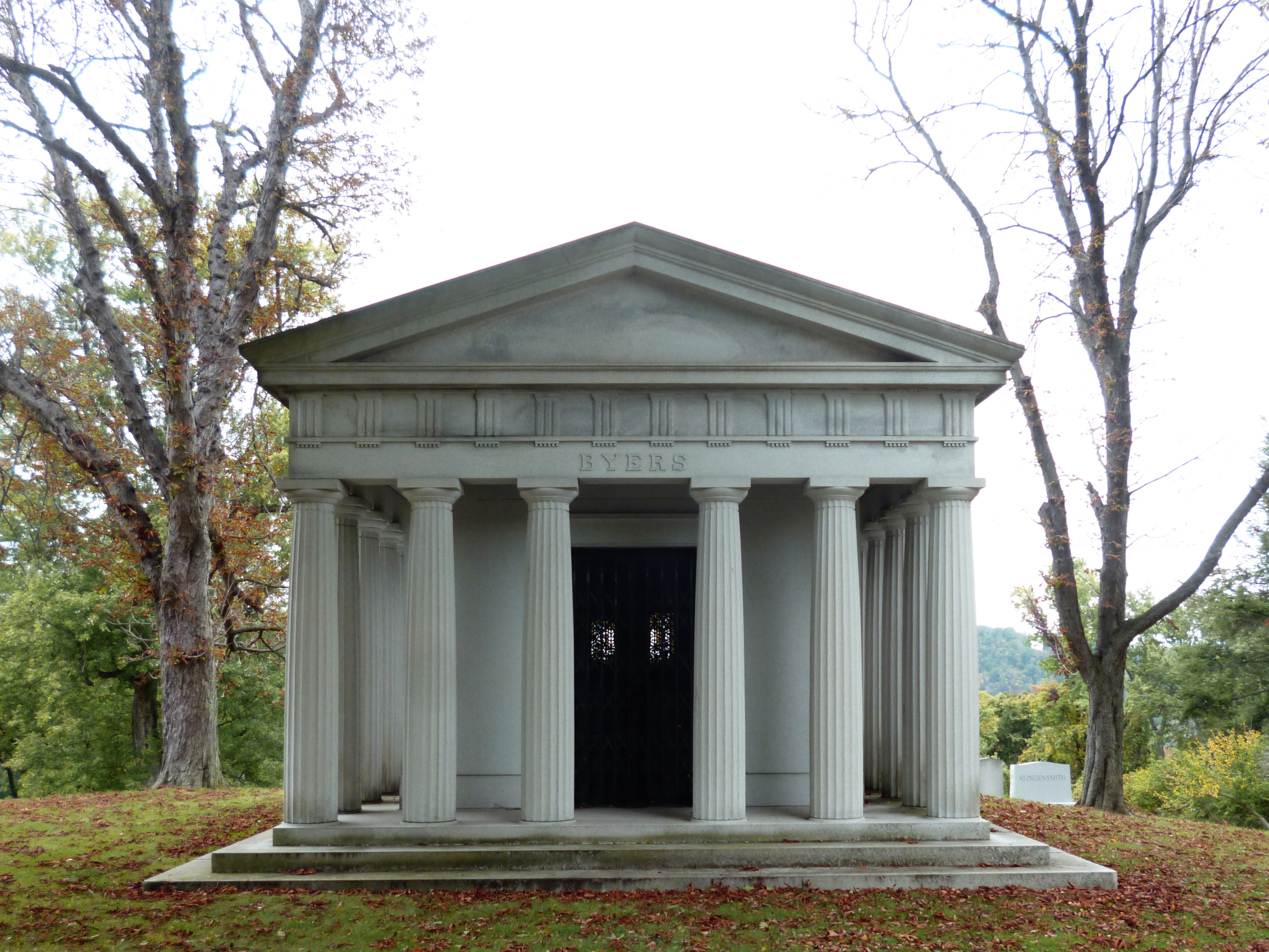
Greek Revival columns on the Mausoleum of Alexander McBurney Byers, Allegheny Cemetery, Pittsburgh, 1902

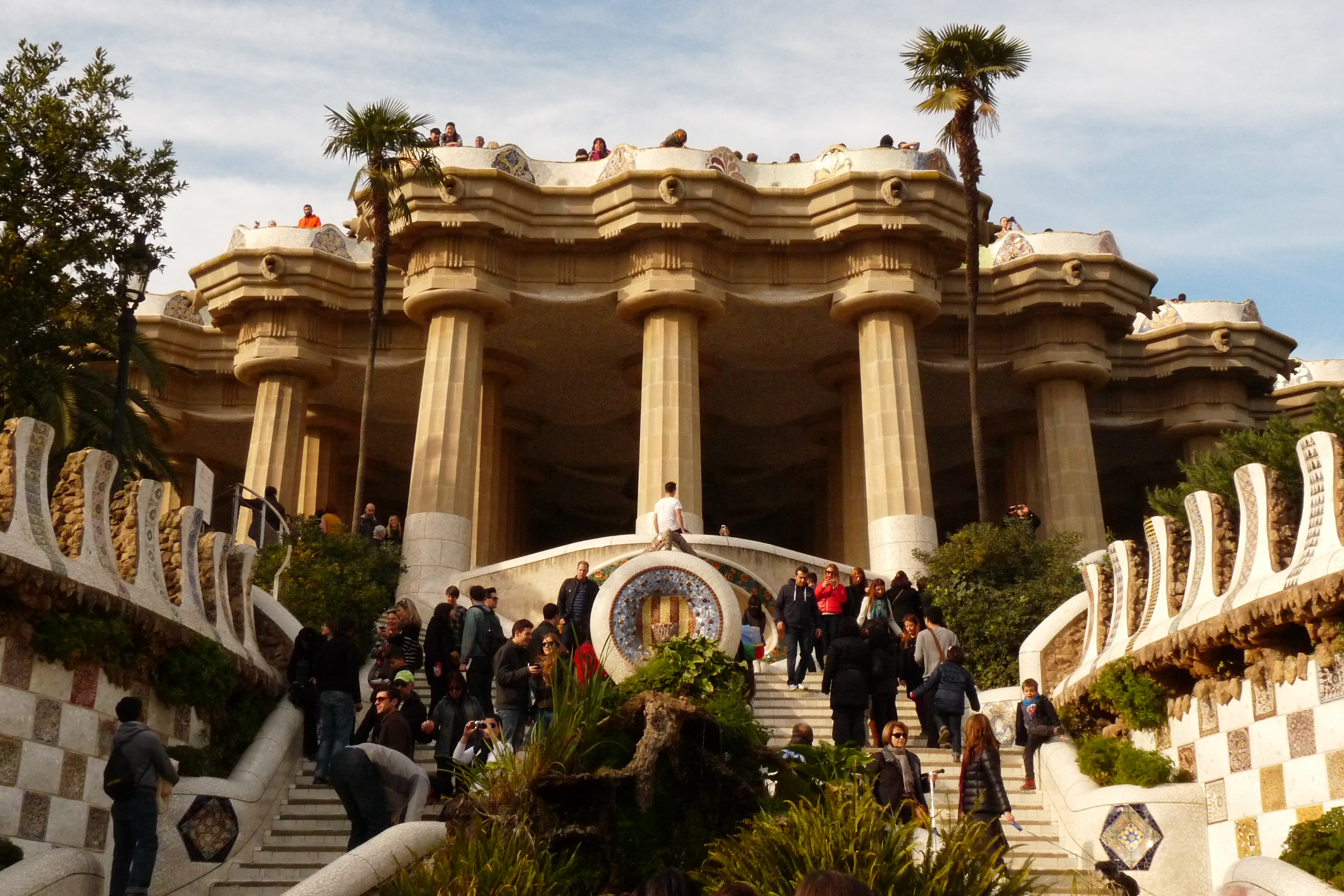
Art Nouveau Doric columns and entablature of The Greek Theatre in the Park Güell, Barcelona, Spain, by Antoni Gaudí, 1900–1914

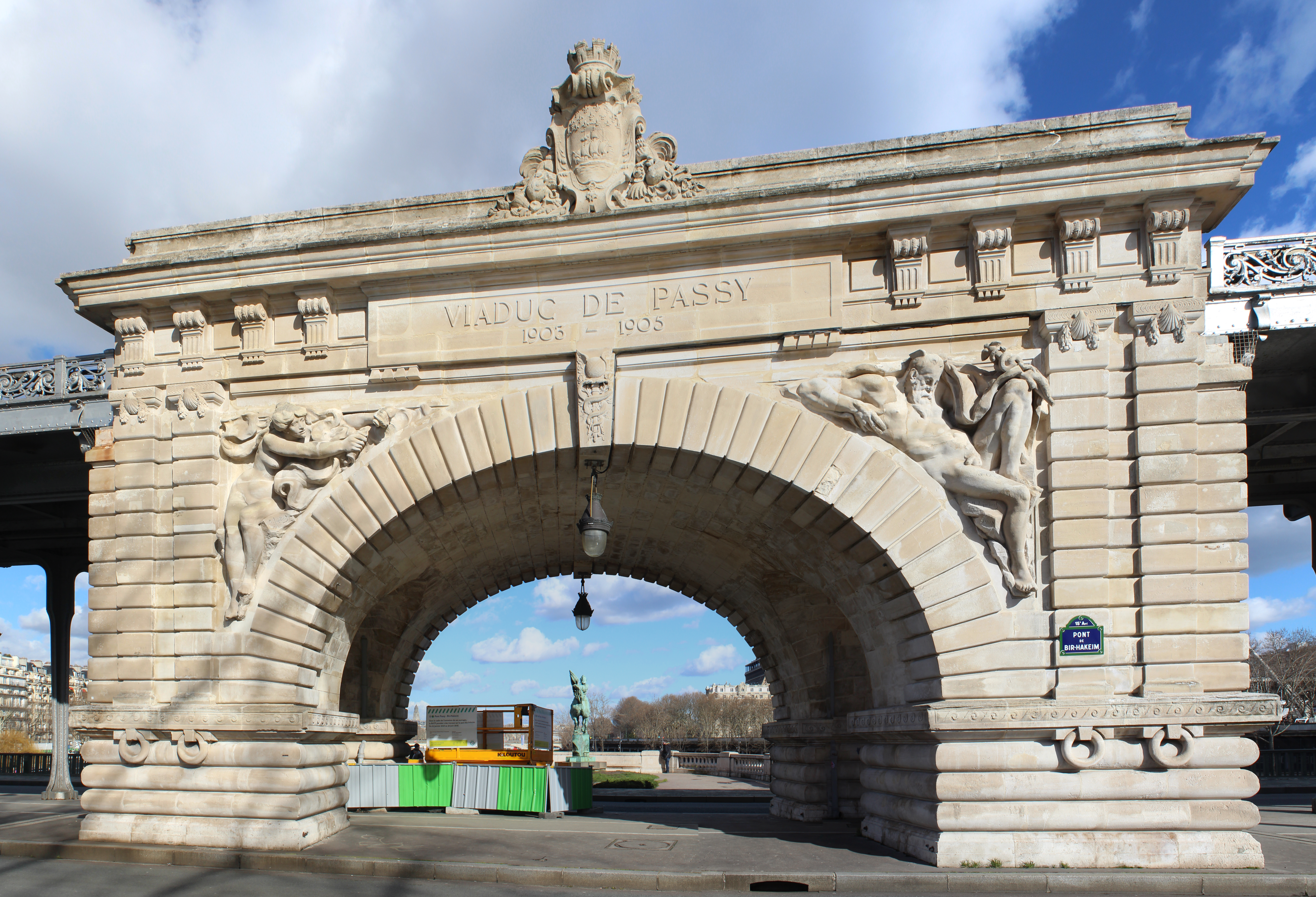
Beaux Arts Doric pilasters of the Pont de Bir-Hakeim, Paris, by Jean-Camille Formigé and Louis Biette, 1903–1905

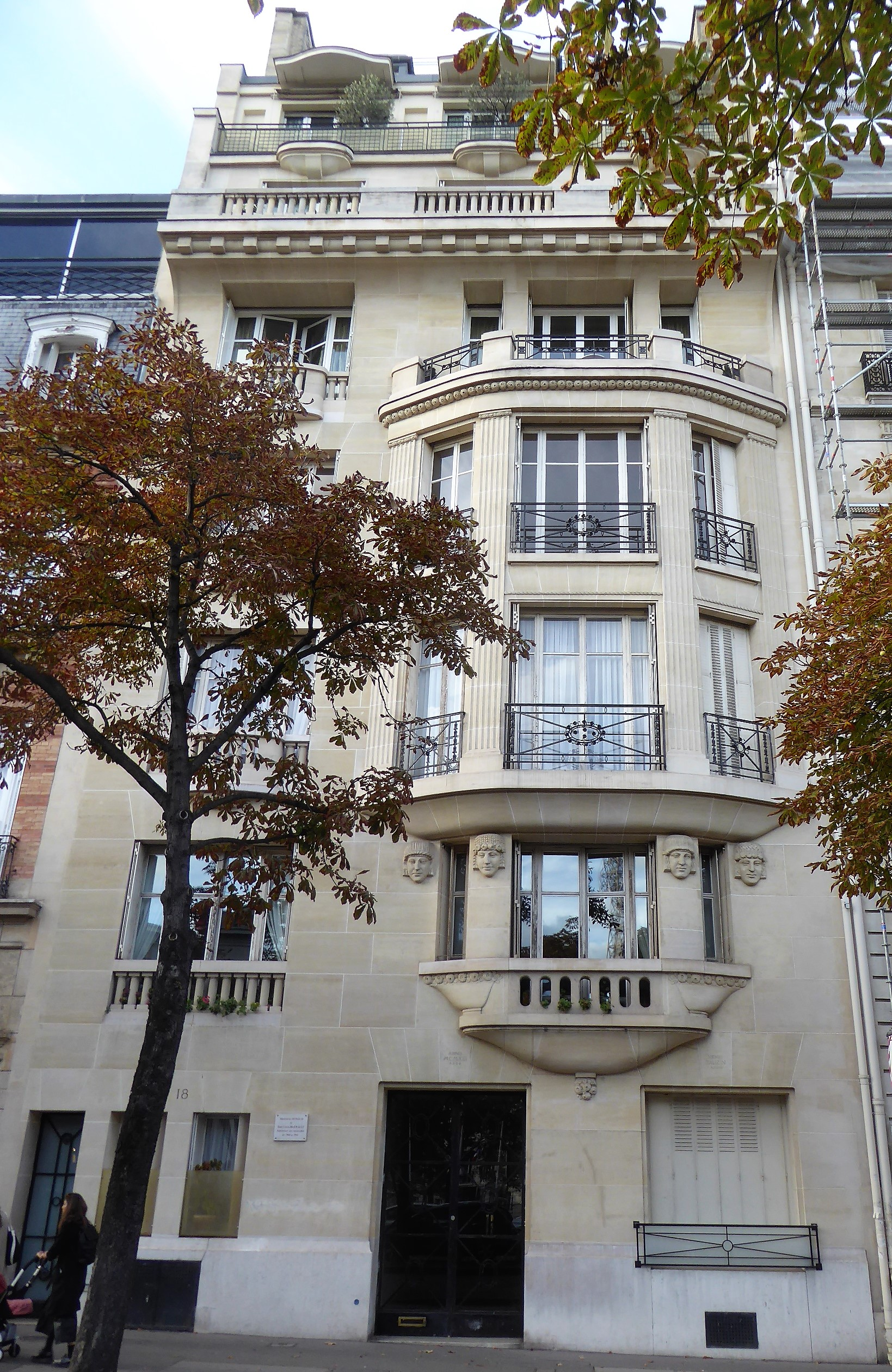
Art Deco reinterpretation of the Doric pilasters on the facade of Avenue du Président-Wilson no. 18, Paris, by Henri Tauzin, 1913

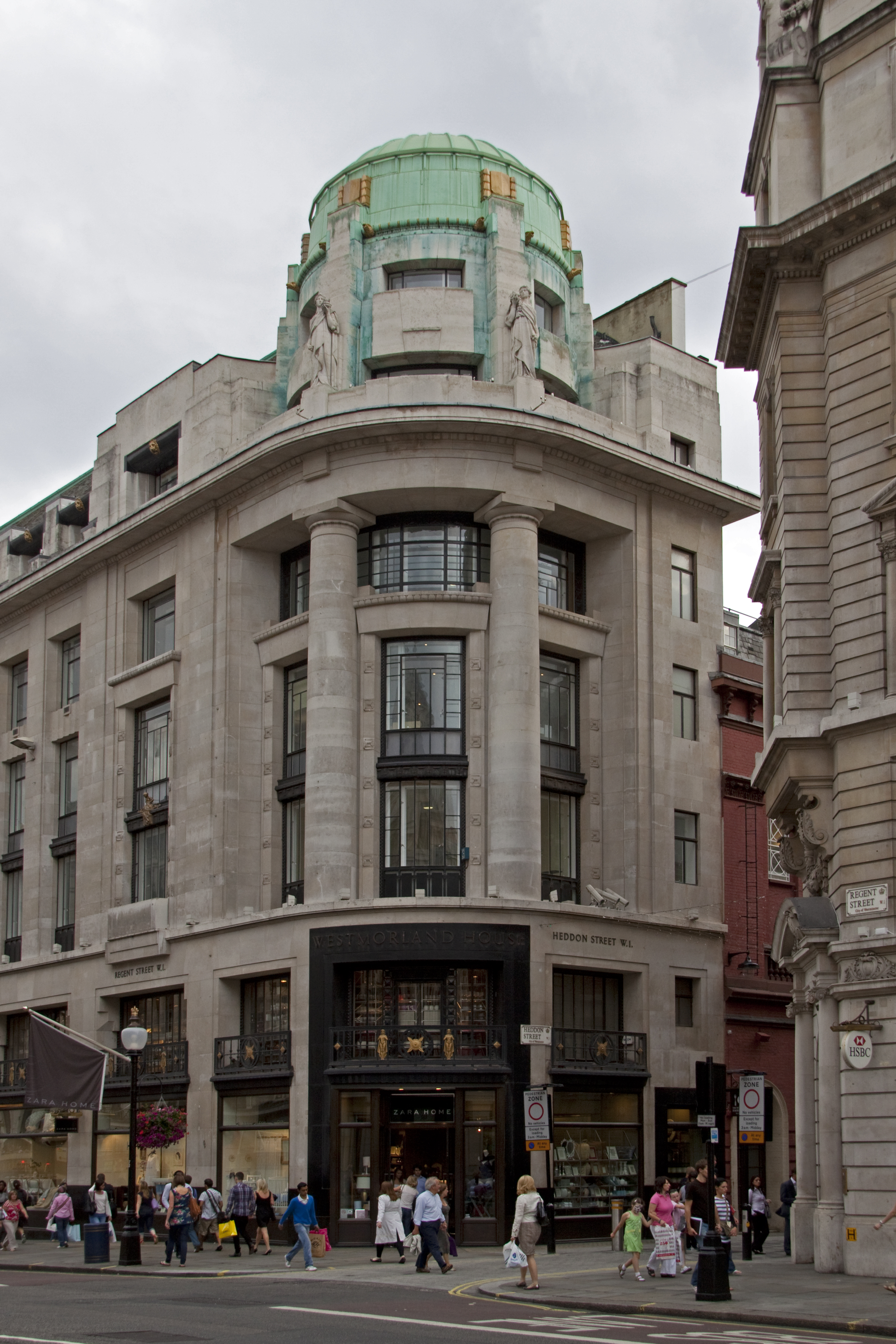
Art Deco reinterpretation of the Doric columns, with no flutings and with little or no entasis, on the Westmorland House (Regent Street no. 117–131), London, by Burnet & Tait, 1920–1925

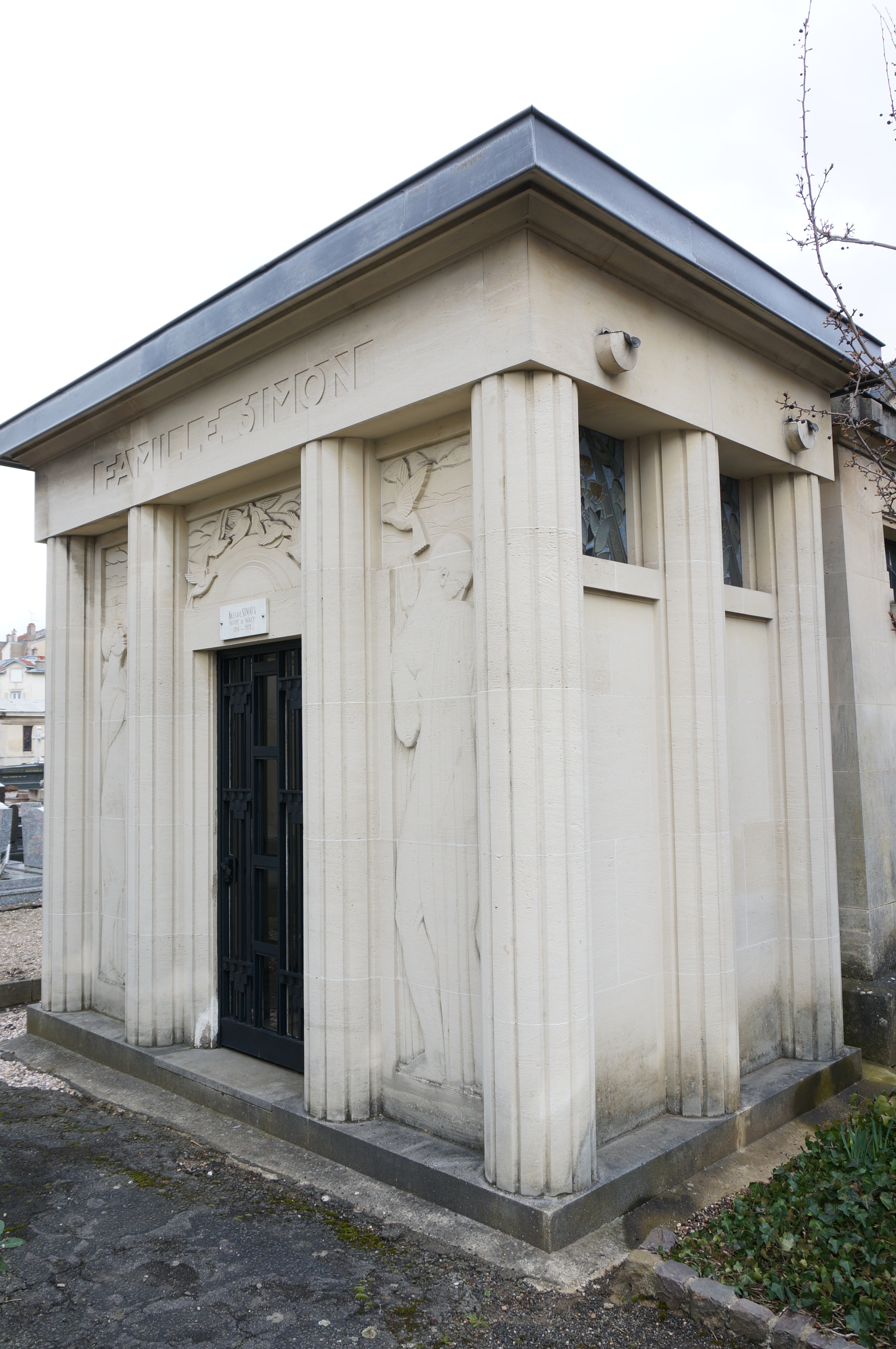
Art Deco reinterpretation of the Doric columns, with no capitals or bases, on the Gustave Simon Grave, Préville Cemetery, Nancy, France, unknown architect, after 1926

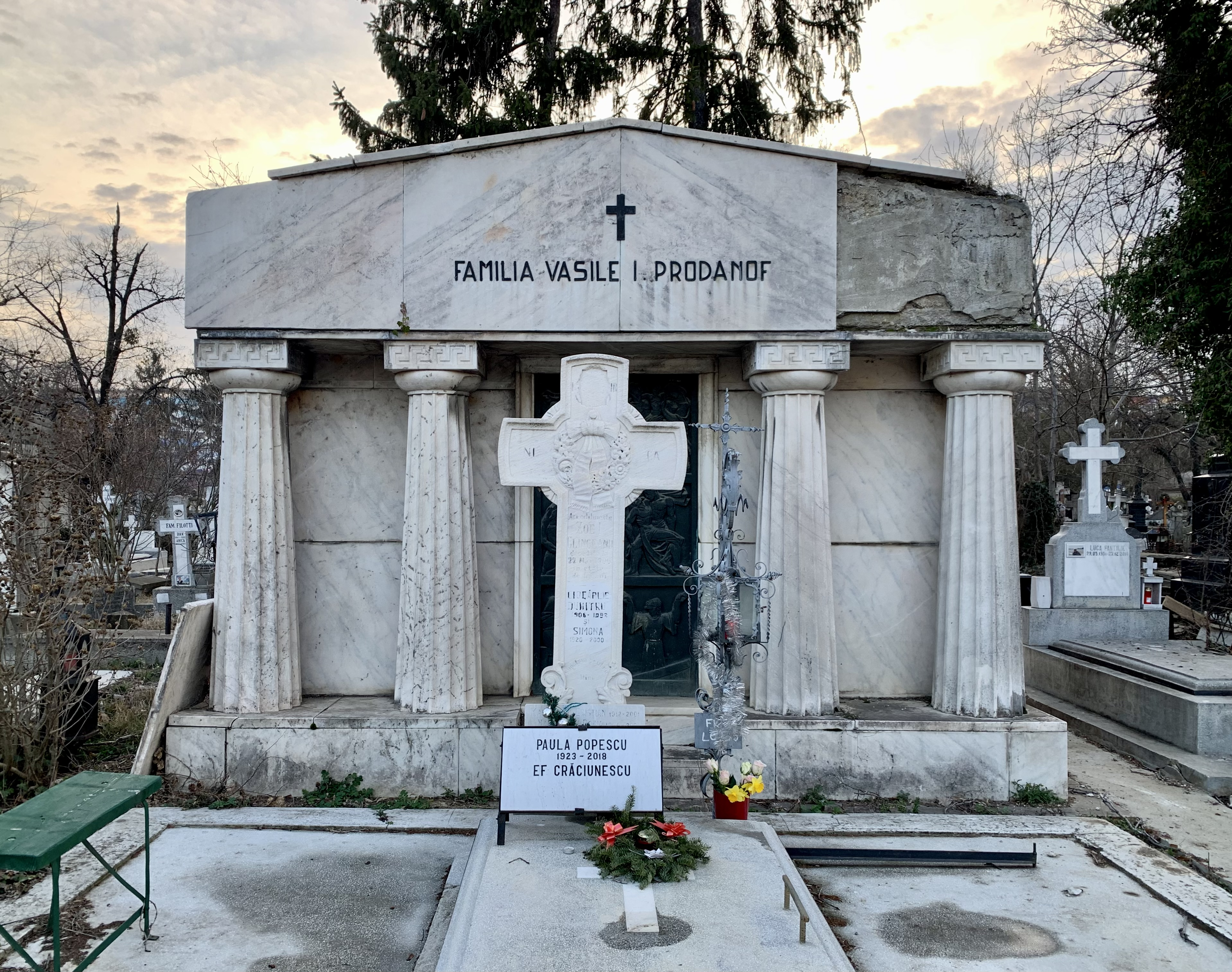
Neoclassical and Art Deco Doric columns of the Vasile I. Prodanof family tomb, Bellu Cemetery, Bucharest, unknown architect, c. 1930

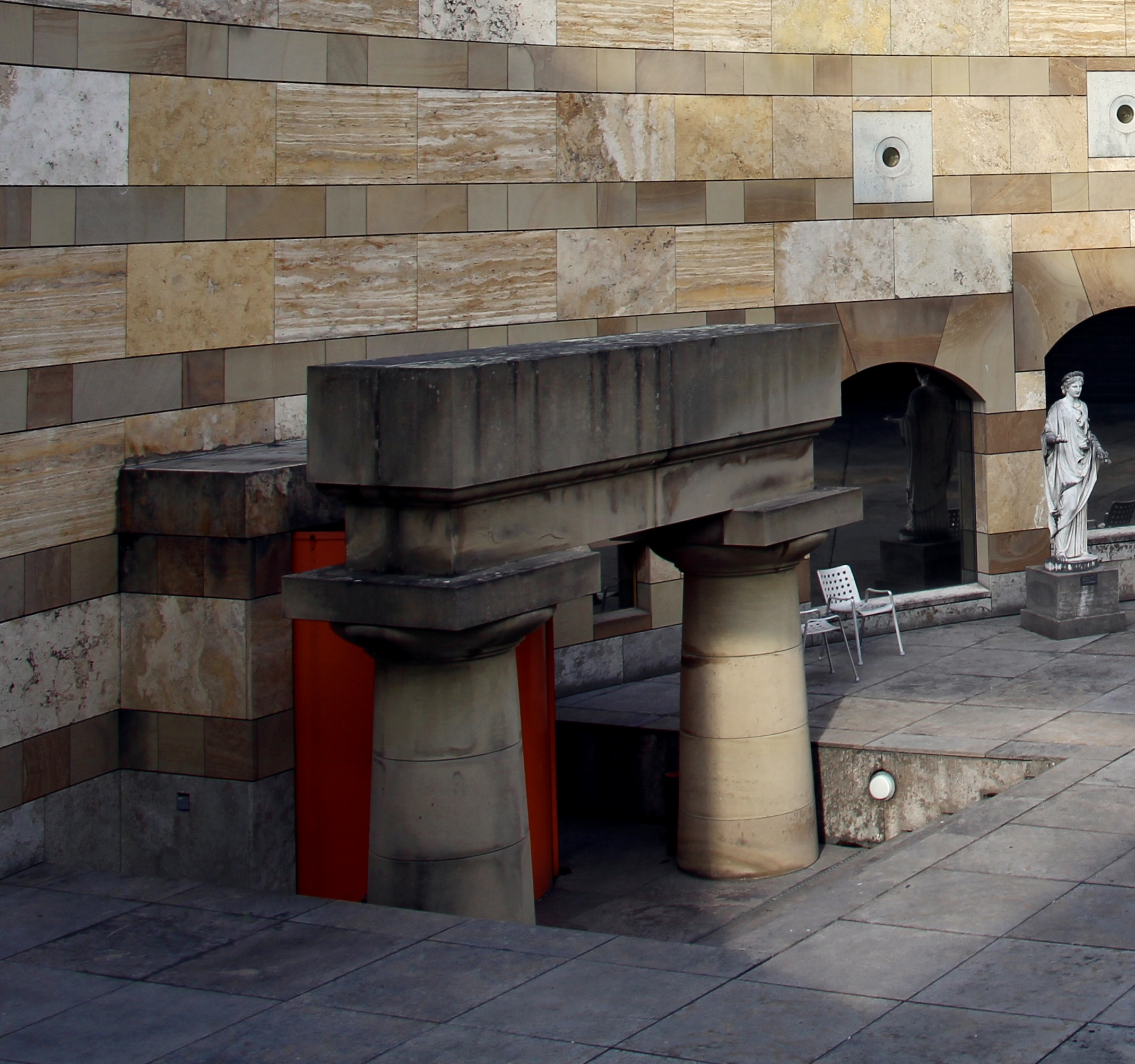
Postmodern Doric columns of the Neue Staatsgalerie, Stuttgart, Germany, by James Stirling, 1984

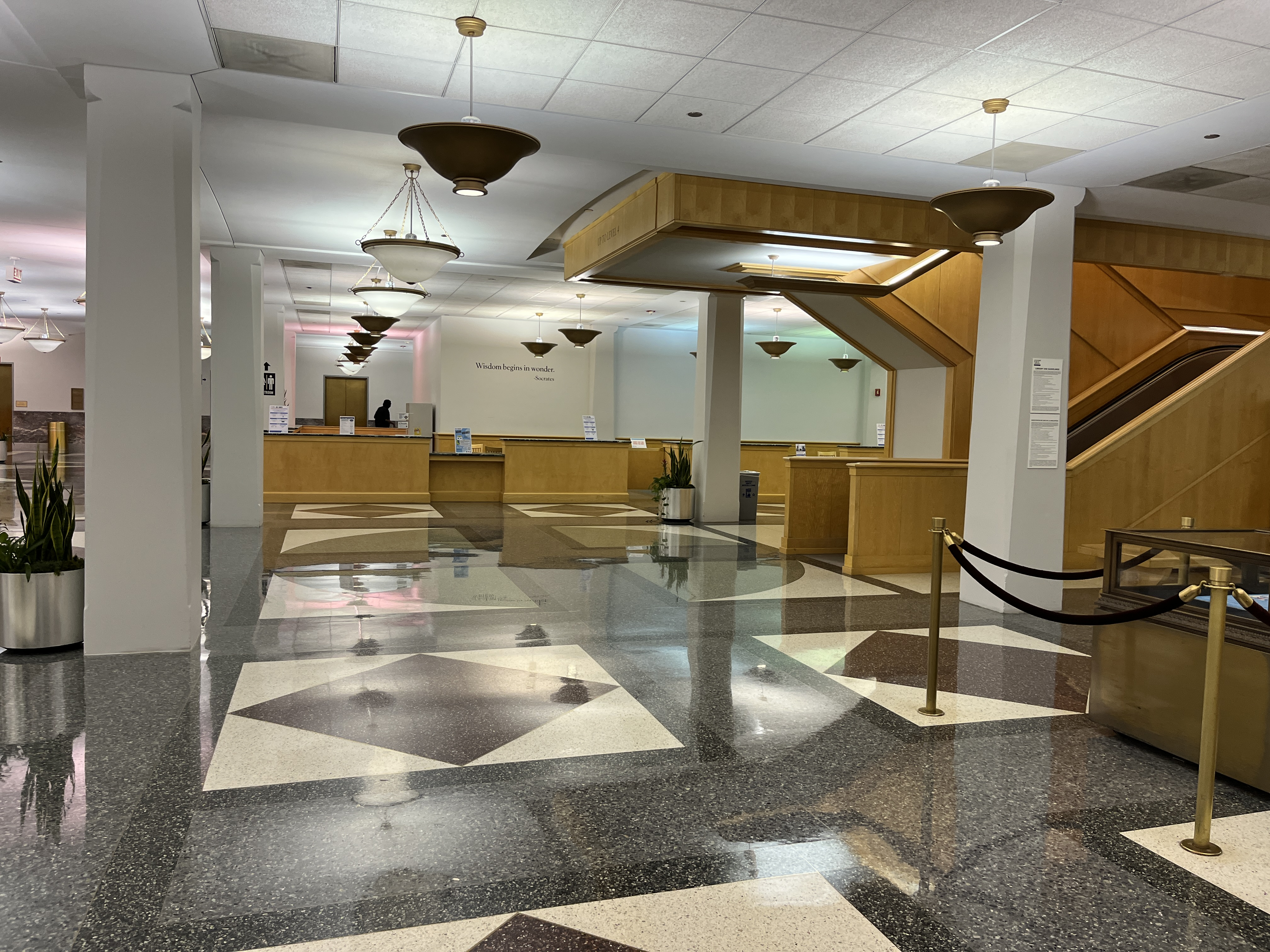
Postmodern reinterpretation of the Doric columns in the Harold Washington Library, Chicago, by Hammond, Beeby & Babka, 1991

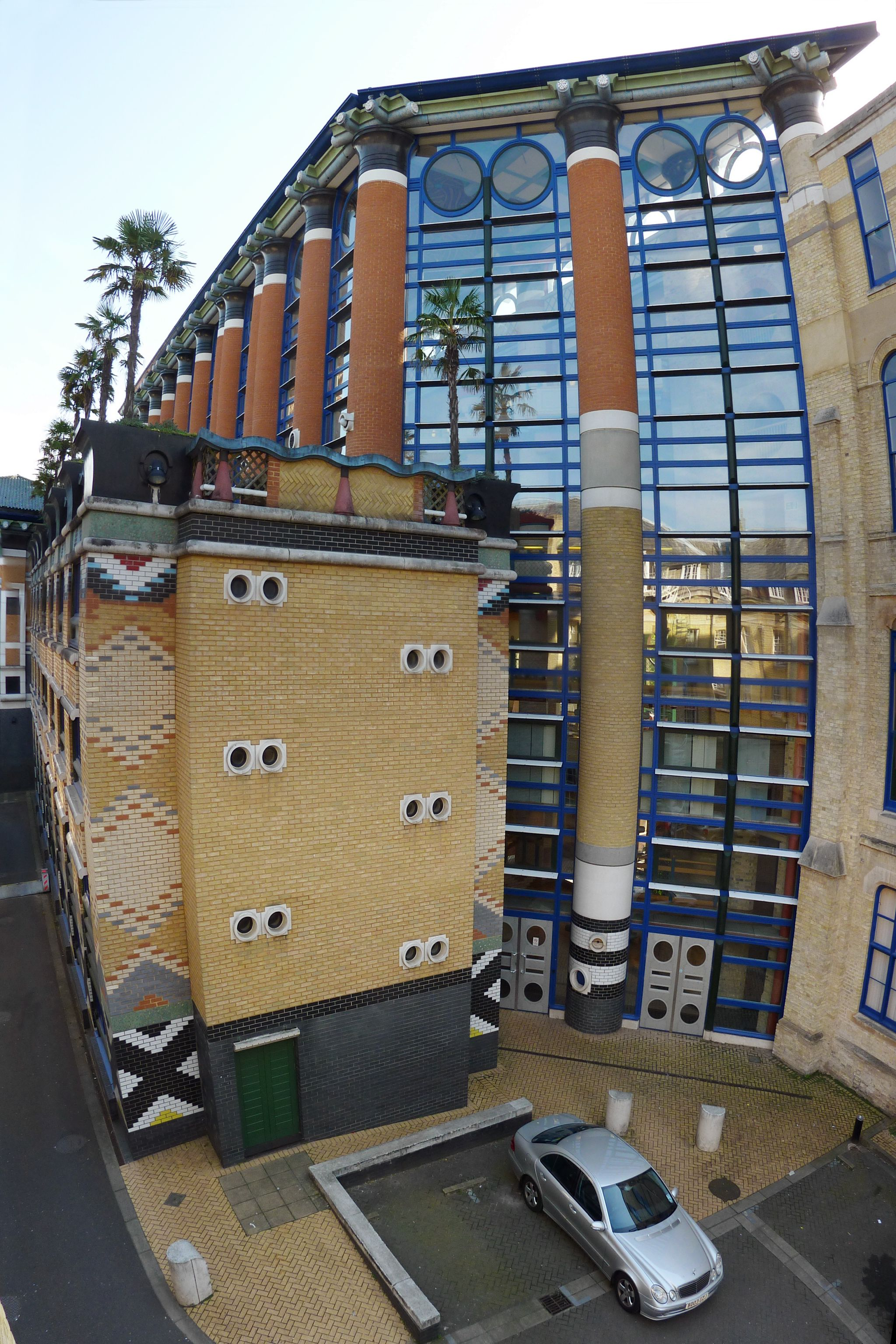
Postmodern Doric columns of the Judge Business School, University of Cambridge, England, by John Outram, 1995

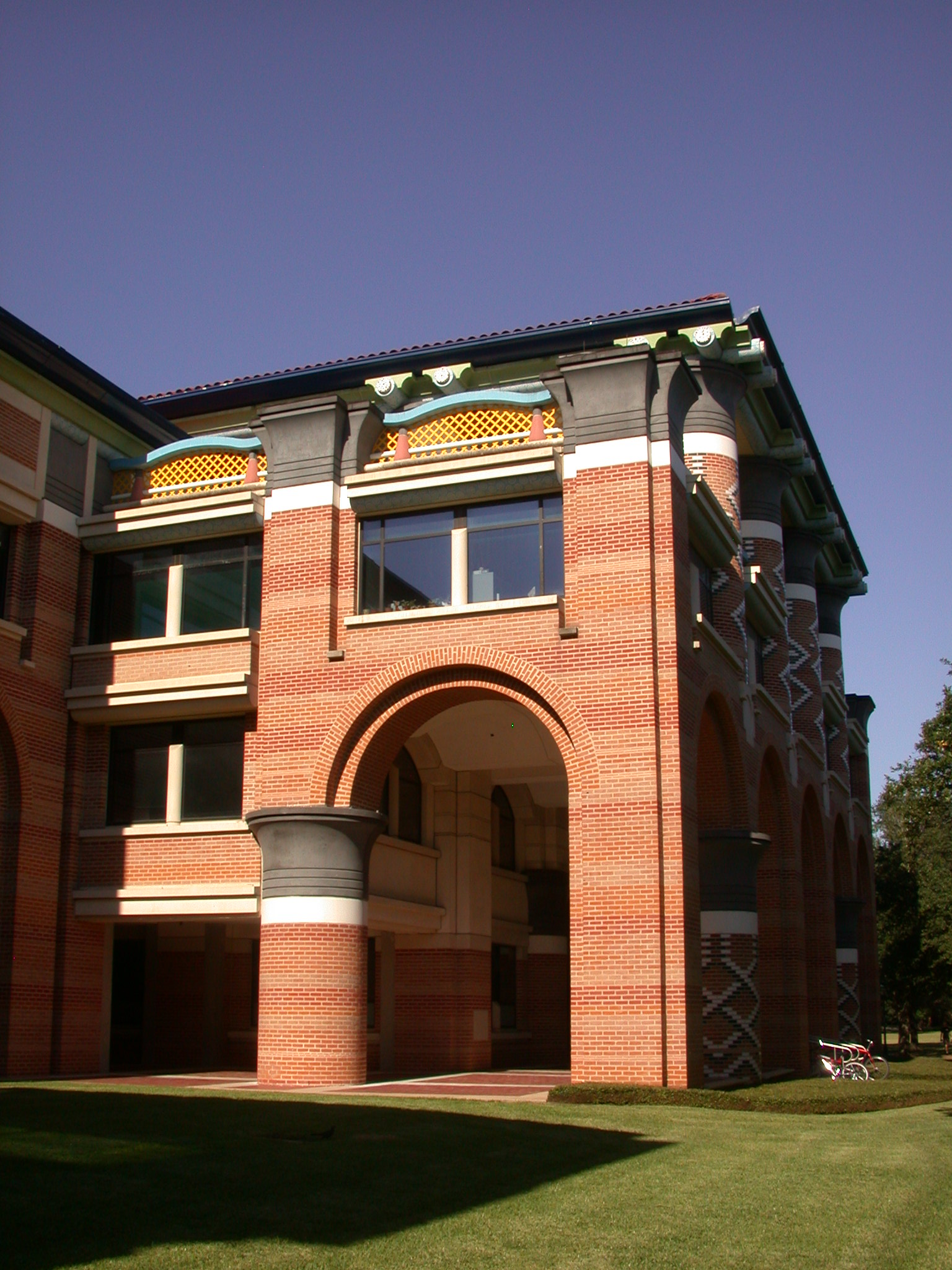
Postmodern Doric pilasters and columns of the Duncan Hall, Rice University, US, by John Outram, 1996

New Classical Doric columns of the Maitland Robinson Library, Downing College, Cambridge University, Cambridge, by Quinlan Terry, 1992

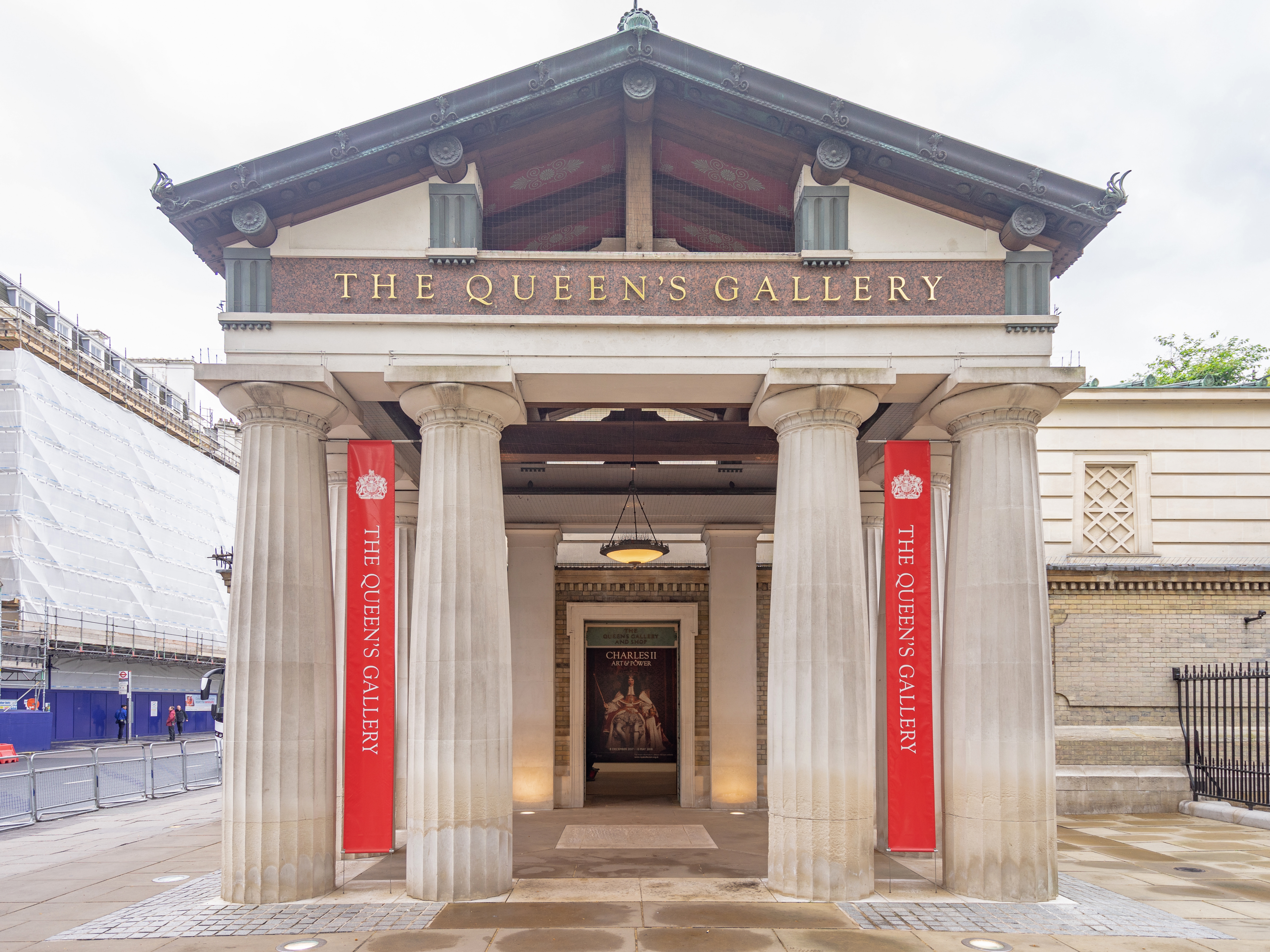
New Classical Doric columns of the Queen's Gallery, Buckingham Palace, London, inspired by the one from the Temple of Hera I at Paestum, by John Simpson, 2000–2002

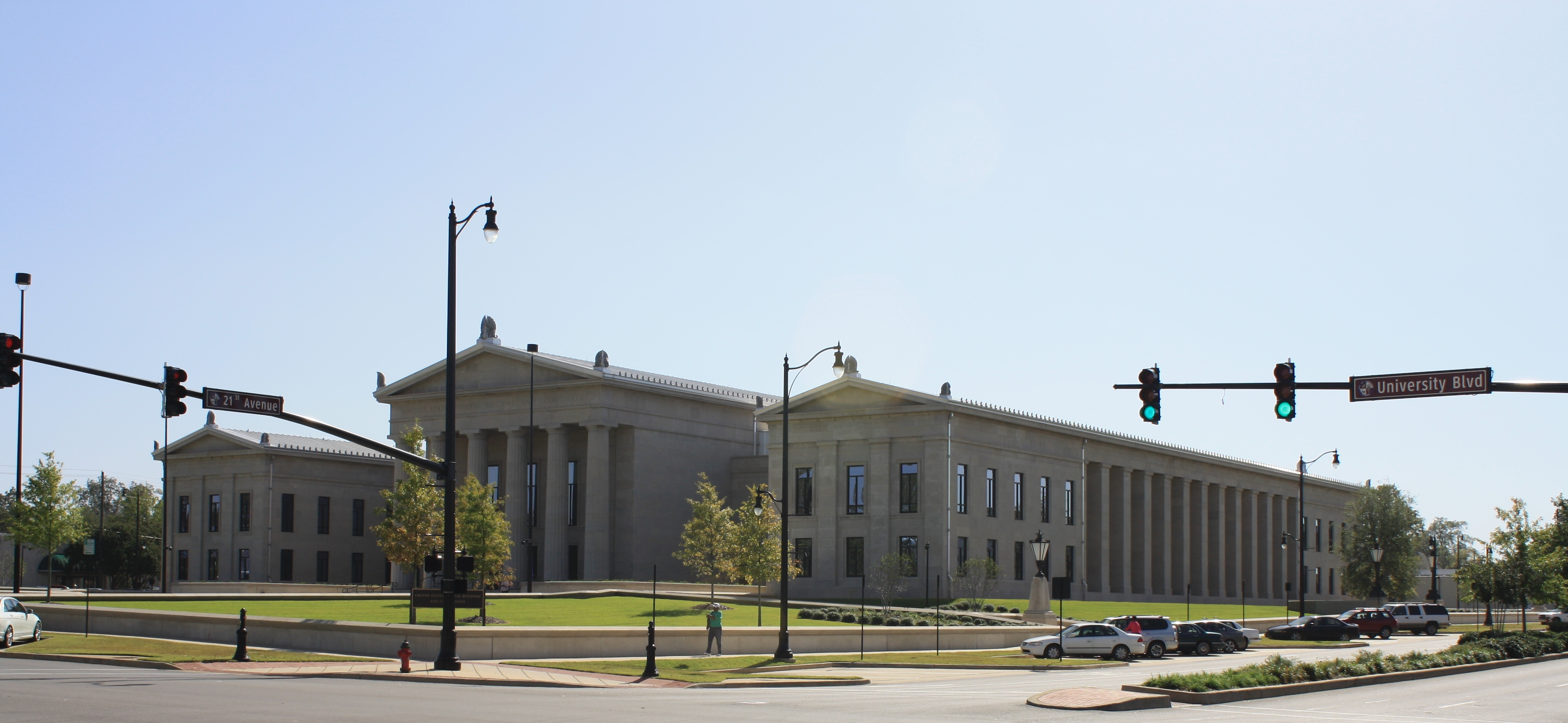
New Classical Doric columns of the Federal Building and Courthouse, Tuscaloosa, Alabama, US, inspired by those of the Temple of Zeus in Nemea, by the Chicago architectural firm Hammond Beeby Rupert Ainge, 2011

== See also ==
- Geison
